

188001–188100 

|-bgcolor=#E9E9E9
| 188001 ||  || — || September 19, 2001 || Socorro || LINEAR || — || align=right | 1.5 km || 
|-id=002 bgcolor=#E9E9E9
| 188002 ||  || — || September 19, 2001 || Socorro || LINEAR || — || align=right | 1.1 km || 
|-id=003 bgcolor=#E9E9E9
| 188003 ||  || — || September 20, 2001 || Socorro || LINEAR || — || align=right | 2.8 km || 
|-id=004 bgcolor=#fefefe
| 188004 ||  || — || September 20, 2001 || Socorro || LINEAR || MAS || align=right | 1.1 km || 
|-id=005 bgcolor=#fefefe
| 188005 ||  || — || September 22, 2001 || Kitt Peak || Spacewatch || — || align=right | 1.2 km || 
|-id=006 bgcolor=#C2FFFF
| 188006 ||  || — || September 25, 2001 || Palomar || NEAT || L5 || align=right | 15 km || 
|-id=007 bgcolor=#E9E9E9
| 188007 ||  || — || October 11, 2001 || Desert Eagle || W. K. Y. Yeung || — || align=right | 2.9 km || 
|-id=008 bgcolor=#E9E9E9
| 188008 ||  || — || October 14, 2001 || Socorro || LINEAR || MAR || align=right | 1.8 km || 
|-id=009 bgcolor=#E9E9E9
| 188009 ||  || — || October 15, 2001 || Socorro || LINEAR || EUN || align=right | 2.3 km || 
|-id=010 bgcolor=#E9E9E9
| 188010 ||  || — || October 14, 2001 || Socorro || LINEAR || — || align=right | 2.0 km || 
|-id=011 bgcolor=#fefefe
| 188011 ||  || — || October 14, 2001 || Socorro || LINEAR || MAS || align=right data-sort-value="0.95" | 950 m || 
|-id=012 bgcolor=#E9E9E9
| 188012 ||  || — || October 14, 2001 || Socorro || LINEAR || — || align=right | 1.1 km || 
|-id=013 bgcolor=#E9E9E9
| 188013 ||  || — || October 12, 2001 || Haleakala || NEAT || EUN || align=right | 2.2 km || 
|-id=014 bgcolor=#E9E9E9
| 188014 ||  || — || October 14, 2001 || Palomar || NEAT || — || align=right | 2.1 km || 
|-id=015 bgcolor=#E9E9E9
| 188015 ||  || — || October 10, 2001 || Palomar || NEAT || — || align=right | 3.3 km || 
|-id=016 bgcolor=#E9E9E9
| 188016 ||  || — || October 11, 2001 || Palomar || NEAT || — || align=right | 1.7 km || 
|-id=017 bgcolor=#E9E9E9
| 188017 ||  || — || October 15, 2001 || Palomar || NEAT || — || align=right | 1.7 km || 
|-id=018 bgcolor=#E9E9E9
| 188018 ||  || — || October 11, 2001 || Socorro || LINEAR || — || align=right | 1.4 km || 
|-id=019 bgcolor=#E9E9E9
| 188019 ||  || — || October 11, 2001 || Palomar || NEAT || — || align=right | 1.1 km || 
|-id=020 bgcolor=#C2FFFF
| 188020 ||  || — || October 10, 2001 || Palomar || NEAT || L5 || align=right | 14 km || 
|-id=021 bgcolor=#E9E9E9
| 188021 ||  || — || October 16, 2001 || Socorro || LINEAR || RAF || align=right | 3.3 km || 
|-id=022 bgcolor=#E9E9E9
| 188022 ||  || — || October 17, 2001 || Socorro || LINEAR || — || align=right | 2.9 km || 
|-id=023 bgcolor=#fefefe
| 188023 ||  || — || October 17, 2001 || Socorro || LINEAR || NYS || align=right data-sort-value="0.93" | 930 m || 
|-id=024 bgcolor=#E9E9E9
| 188024 ||  || — || October 19, 2001 || Kitt Peak || Spacewatch || — || align=right | 1.7 km || 
|-id=025 bgcolor=#E9E9E9
| 188025 ||  || — || October 17, 2001 || Socorro || LINEAR || — || align=right | 2.7 km || 
|-id=026 bgcolor=#C2FFFF
| 188026 ||  || — || October 20, 2001 || Socorro || LINEAR || L5 || align=right | 14 km || 
|-id=027 bgcolor=#E9E9E9
| 188027 ||  || — || October 20, 2001 || Socorro || LINEAR || — || align=right | 3.6 km || 
|-id=028 bgcolor=#E9E9E9
| 188028 ||  || — || October 21, 2001 || Socorro || LINEAR || — || align=right | 3.9 km || 
|-id=029 bgcolor=#E9E9E9
| 188029 ||  || — || October 21, 2001 || Socorro || LINEAR || HNS || align=right | 1.6 km || 
|-id=030 bgcolor=#E9E9E9
| 188030 ||  || — || October 22, 2001 || Socorro || LINEAR || — || align=right | 1.2 km || 
|-id=031 bgcolor=#E9E9E9
| 188031 ||  || — || October 22, 2001 || Socorro || LINEAR || — || align=right | 1.4 km || 
|-id=032 bgcolor=#E9E9E9
| 188032 ||  || — || October 22, 2001 || Socorro || LINEAR || — || align=right | 2.7 km || 
|-id=033 bgcolor=#E9E9E9
| 188033 ||  || — || October 22, 2001 || Palomar || NEAT || EUN || align=right | 1.7 km || 
|-id=034 bgcolor=#E9E9E9
| 188034 ||  || — || October 22, 2001 || Socorro || LINEAR || — || align=right | 1.7 km || 
|-id=035 bgcolor=#E9E9E9
| 188035 ||  || — || October 22, 2001 || Socorro || LINEAR || — || align=right | 1.7 km || 
|-id=036 bgcolor=#E9E9E9
| 188036 ||  || — || October 23, 2001 || Socorro || LINEAR || — || align=right | 3.0 km || 
|-id=037 bgcolor=#E9E9E9
| 188037 ||  || — || October 23, 2001 || Socorro || LINEAR || HNS || align=right | 1.7 km || 
|-id=038 bgcolor=#E9E9E9
| 188038 ||  || — || October 21, 2001 || Socorro || LINEAR || — || align=right | 3.8 km || 
|-id=039 bgcolor=#E9E9E9
| 188039 ||  || — || October 18, 2001 || Palomar || NEAT || — || align=right | 2.6 km || 
|-id=040 bgcolor=#E9E9E9
| 188040 ||  || — || October 21, 2001 || Socorro || LINEAR || — || align=right | 3.4 km || 
|-id=041 bgcolor=#E9E9E9
| 188041 ||  || — || October 16, 2001 || Palomar || NEAT || — || align=right | 3.3 km || 
|-id=042 bgcolor=#E9E9E9
| 188042 ||  || — || October 17, 2001 || Palomar || NEAT || — || align=right | 1.2 km || 
|-id=043 bgcolor=#E9E9E9
| 188043 ||  || — || October 18, 2001 || Palomar || NEAT || — || align=right | 1.7 km || 
|-id=044 bgcolor=#fefefe
| 188044 ||  || — || October 18, 2001 || Socorro || LINEAR || — || align=right | 3.2 km || 
|-id=045 bgcolor=#E9E9E9
| 188045 ||  || — || October 24, 2001 || Socorro || LINEAR || — || align=right | 3.4 km || 
|-id=046 bgcolor=#E9E9E9
| 188046 ||  || — || November 9, 2001 || Socorro || LINEAR || — || align=right | 3.4 km || 
|-id=047 bgcolor=#fefefe
| 188047 ||  || — || November 9, 2001 || Socorro || LINEAR || NYS || align=right | 1.1 km || 
|-id=048 bgcolor=#fefefe
| 188048 ||  || — || November 9, 2001 || Socorro || LINEAR || H || align=right data-sort-value="0.98" | 980 m || 
|-id=049 bgcolor=#E9E9E9
| 188049 ||  || — || November 9, 2001 || Socorro || LINEAR || — || align=right | 1.6 km || 
|-id=050 bgcolor=#E9E9E9
| 188050 ||  || — || November 10, 2001 || Socorro || LINEAR || — || align=right | 3.2 km || 
|-id=051 bgcolor=#fefefe
| 188051 ||  || — || November 11, 2001 || Socorro || LINEAR || H || align=right data-sort-value="0.98" | 980 m || 
|-id=052 bgcolor=#E9E9E9
| 188052 ||  || — || November 12, 2001 || Haleakala || NEAT || — || align=right | 3.3 km || 
|-id=053 bgcolor=#C2FFFF
| 188053 ||  || — || November 10, 2001 || Socorro || LINEAR || L5 || align=right | 15 km || 
|-id=054 bgcolor=#E9E9E9
| 188054 ||  || — || November 15, 2001 || Socorro || LINEAR || — || align=right | 3.2 km || 
|-id=055 bgcolor=#E9E9E9
| 188055 ||  || — || November 15, 2001 || Socorro || LINEAR || — || align=right | 5.4 km || 
|-id=056 bgcolor=#E9E9E9
| 188056 ||  || — || November 12, 2001 || Socorro || LINEAR || — || align=right | 3.9 km || 
|-id=057 bgcolor=#E9E9E9
| 188057 ||  || — || November 12, 2001 || Socorro || LINEAR || — || align=right | 1.8 km || 
|-id=058 bgcolor=#fefefe
| 188058 ||  || — || November 12, 2001 || Socorro || LINEAR || — || align=right | 1.8 km || 
|-id=059 bgcolor=#E9E9E9
| 188059 ||  || — || November 12, 2001 || Socorro || LINEAR || — || align=right | 2.3 km || 
|-id=060 bgcolor=#C2FFFF
| 188060 ||  || — || November 11, 2001 || Apache Point || SDSS || L5 || align=right | 12 km || 
|-id=061 bgcolor=#E9E9E9
| 188061 Loomis ||  ||  || November 11, 2001 || Apache Point || SDSS || — || align=right | 1.2 km || 
|-id=062 bgcolor=#E9E9E9
| 188062 ||  || — || November 17, 2001 || Socorro || LINEAR || — || align=right | 1.4 km || 
|-id=063 bgcolor=#E9E9E9
| 188063 ||  || — || November 17, 2001 || Socorro || LINEAR || BRG || align=right | 2.5 km || 
|-id=064 bgcolor=#E9E9E9
| 188064 ||  || — || November 17, 2001 || Socorro || LINEAR || HEN || align=right | 1.3 km || 
|-id=065 bgcolor=#E9E9E9
| 188065 ||  || — || November 17, 2001 || Socorro || LINEAR || — || align=right | 3.3 km || 
|-id=066 bgcolor=#E9E9E9
| 188066 ||  || — || November 17, 2001 || Socorro || LINEAR || — || align=right | 3.7 km || 
|-id=067 bgcolor=#E9E9E9
| 188067 ||  || — || November 18, 2001 || Socorro || LINEAR || — || align=right | 1.1 km || 
|-id=068 bgcolor=#E9E9E9
| 188068 ||  || — || November 17, 2001 || Anderson Mesa || LONEOS || — || align=right | 1.8 km || 
|-id=069 bgcolor=#E9E9E9
| 188069 ||  || — || November 19, 2001 || Anderson Mesa || LONEOS || — || align=right | 1.8 km || 
|-id=070 bgcolor=#E9E9E9
| 188070 ||  || — || November 19, 2001 || Anderson Mesa || LONEOS || — || align=right | 3.8 km || 
|-id=071 bgcolor=#E9E9E9
| 188071 ||  || — || November 20, 2001 || Socorro || LINEAR || WIT || align=right | 1.4 km || 
|-id=072 bgcolor=#E9E9E9
| 188072 ||  || — || November 20, 2001 || Socorro || LINEAR || — || align=right | 1.9 km || 
|-id=073 bgcolor=#E9E9E9
| 188073 ||  || — || November 20, 2001 || Socorro || LINEAR || — || align=right | 2.3 km || 
|-id=074 bgcolor=#E9E9E9
| 188074 ||  || — || December 9, 2001 || Socorro || LINEAR || — || align=right | 1.7 km || 
|-id=075 bgcolor=#E9E9E9
| 188075 ||  || — || December 11, 2001 || Socorro || LINEAR || — || align=right | 2.7 km || 
|-id=076 bgcolor=#fefefe
| 188076 ||  || — || December 9, 2001 || Socorro || LINEAR || — || align=right | 3.6 km || 
|-id=077 bgcolor=#fefefe
| 188077 ||  || — || December 9, 2001 || Socorro || LINEAR || Hslow? || align=right | 1.9 km || 
|-id=078 bgcolor=#E9E9E9
| 188078 ||  || — || December 10, 2001 || Socorro || LINEAR || — || align=right | 4.1 km || 
|-id=079 bgcolor=#fefefe
| 188079 ||  || — || December 10, 2001 || Socorro || LINEAR || H || align=right | 1.4 km || 
|-id=080 bgcolor=#E9E9E9
| 188080 ||  || — || December 11, 2001 || Socorro || LINEAR || — || align=right | 3.4 km || 
|-id=081 bgcolor=#E9E9E9
| 188081 ||  || — || December 14, 2001 || Desert Eagle || W. K. Y. Yeung || MIT || align=right | 4.3 km || 
|-id=082 bgcolor=#E9E9E9
| 188082 ||  || — || December 10, 2001 || Socorro || LINEAR || EUN || align=right | 2.4 km || 
|-id=083 bgcolor=#C2FFFF
| 188083 ||  || — || December 14, 2001 || Socorro || LINEAR || L5 || align=right | 14 km || 
|-id=084 bgcolor=#E9E9E9
| 188084 ||  || — || December 14, 2001 || Socorro || LINEAR || — || align=right | 3.4 km || 
|-id=085 bgcolor=#E9E9E9
| 188085 ||  || — || December 14, 2001 || Socorro || LINEAR || — || align=right | 1.9 km || 
|-id=086 bgcolor=#E9E9E9
| 188086 ||  || — || December 14, 2001 || Socorro || LINEAR || — || align=right | 2.8 km || 
|-id=087 bgcolor=#E9E9E9
| 188087 ||  || — || December 14, 2001 || Socorro || LINEAR || — || align=right | 4.7 km || 
|-id=088 bgcolor=#E9E9E9
| 188088 ||  || — || December 14, 2001 || Socorro || LINEAR || — || align=right | 3.2 km || 
|-id=089 bgcolor=#E9E9E9
| 188089 ||  || — || December 14, 2001 || Socorro || LINEAR || — || align=right | 2.2 km || 
|-id=090 bgcolor=#d6d6d6
| 188090 ||  || — || December 14, 2001 || Socorro || LINEAR || — || align=right | 4.2 km || 
|-id=091 bgcolor=#E9E9E9
| 188091 ||  || — || December 14, 2001 || Socorro || LINEAR || MRX || align=right | 1.6 km || 
|-id=092 bgcolor=#E9E9E9
| 188092 ||  || — || December 14, 2001 || Socorro || LINEAR || — || align=right | 2.2 km || 
|-id=093 bgcolor=#E9E9E9
| 188093 ||  || — || December 14, 2001 || Socorro || LINEAR || MRX || align=right | 1.3 km || 
|-id=094 bgcolor=#E9E9E9
| 188094 ||  || — || December 15, 2001 || Socorro || LINEAR || — || align=right | 2.6 km || 
|-id=095 bgcolor=#E9E9E9
| 188095 ||  || — || December 15, 2001 || Socorro || LINEAR || — || align=right | 2.6 km || 
|-id=096 bgcolor=#E9E9E9
| 188096 ||  || — || December 15, 2001 || Socorro || LINEAR || MAR || align=right | 1.7 km || 
|-id=097 bgcolor=#E9E9E9
| 188097 ||  || — || December 20, 2001 || Cima Ekar || ADAS || — || align=right | 3.4 km || 
|-id=098 bgcolor=#d6d6d6
| 188098 ||  || — || December 17, 2001 || Socorro || LINEAR || KOR || align=right | 2.2 km || 
|-id=099 bgcolor=#E9E9E9
| 188099 ||  || — || December 18, 2001 || Socorro || LINEAR || — || align=right | 2.9 km || 
|-id=100 bgcolor=#E9E9E9
| 188100 ||  || — || December 18, 2001 || Socorro || LINEAR || AER || align=right | 2.2 km || 
|}

188101–188200 

|-bgcolor=#E9E9E9
| 188101 ||  || — || December 18, 2001 || Socorro || LINEAR || — || align=right | 4.7 km || 
|-id=102 bgcolor=#fefefe
| 188102 ||  || — || December 17, 2001 || Socorro || LINEAR || — || align=right | 2.2 km || 
|-id=103 bgcolor=#E9E9E9
| 188103 ||  || — || December 17, 2001 || Socorro || LINEAR || — || align=right | 3.9 km || 
|-id=104 bgcolor=#E9E9E9
| 188104 ||  || — || December 17, 2001 || Socorro || LINEAR || — || align=right | 2.2 km || 
|-id=105 bgcolor=#E9E9E9
| 188105 ||  || — || December 18, 2001 || Kitt Peak || Spacewatch || — || align=right | 1.7 km || 
|-id=106 bgcolor=#E9E9E9
| 188106 ||  || — || December 17, 2001 || Socorro || LINEAR || GEF || align=right | 2.1 km || 
|-id=107 bgcolor=#E9E9E9
| 188107 ||  || — || December 18, 2001 || Socorro || LINEAR || — || align=right | 1.8 km || 
|-id=108 bgcolor=#E9E9E9
| 188108 ||  || — || December 17, 2001 || Socorro || LINEAR || — || align=right | 1.6 km || 
|-id=109 bgcolor=#d6d6d6
| 188109 ||  || — || January 7, 2002 || Kitt Peak || Spacewatch || K-2 || align=right | 1.7 km || 
|-id=110 bgcolor=#E9E9E9
| 188110 ||  || — || January 8, 2002 || Haleakala || NEAT || — || align=right | 4.3 km || 
|-id=111 bgcolor=#E9E9E9
| 188111 ||  || — || January 9, 2002 || Socorro || LINEAR || — || align=right | 3.2 km || 
|-id=112 bgcolor=#E9E9E9
| 188112 ||  || — || January 12, 2002 || Socorro || LINEAR || HOF || align=right | 3.9 km || 
|-id=113 bgcolor=#E9E9E9
| 188113 ||  || — || January 9, 2002 || Campo Imperatore || CINEOS || MRX || align=right | 1.7 km || 
|-id=114 bgcolor=#E9E9E9
| 188114 ||  || — || January 9, 2002 || Socorro || LINEAR || — || align=right | 3.7 km || 
|-id=115 bgcolor=#E9E9E9
| 188115 ||  || — || January 9, 2002 || Socorro || LINEAR || — || align=right | 2.8 km || 
|-id=116 bgcolor=#E9E9E9
| 188116 ||  || — || January 8, 2002 || Socorro || LINEAR || MRX || align=right | 1.6 km || 
|-id=117 bgcolor=#E9E9E9
| 188117 ||  || — || January 14, 2002 || Socorro || LINEAR || — || align=right | 2.6 km || 
|-id=118 bgcolor=#E9E9E9
| 188118 ||  || — || January 5, 2002 || Palomar || NEAT || GAL || align=right | 3.3 km || 
|-id=119 bgcolor=#E9E9E9
| 188119 ||  || — || January 6, 2002 || Goodricke-Pigott || R. A. Tucker || — || align=right | 4.3 km || 
|-id=120 bgcolor=#d6d6d6
| 188120 ||  || — || January 8, 2002 || Palomar || NEAT || — || align=right | 3.4 km || 
|-id=121 bgcolor=#d6d6d6
| 188121 ||  || — || January 22, 2002 || Socorro || LINEAR || — || align=right | 3.4 km || 
|-id=122 bgcolor=#E9E9E9
| 188122 || 2002 CH || — || February 6, 2002 || Socorro || LINEAR || — || align=right | 4.1 km || 
|-id=123 bgcolor=#d6d6d6
| 188123 || 2002 CT || — || February 2, 2002 || Cima Ekar || ADAS || — || align=right | 2.9 km || 
|-id=124 bgcolor=#d6d6d6
| 188124 ||  || — || February 6, 2002 || Socorro || LINEAR || — || align=right | 4.1 km || 
|-id=125 bgcolor=#d6d6d6
| 188125 ||  || — || February 6, 2002 || Socorro || LINEAR || EOS || align=right | 2.4 km || 
|-id=126 bgcolor=#d6d6d6
| 188126 ||  || — || February 7, 2002 || Socorro || LINEAR || — || align=right | 2.9 km || 
|-id=127 bgcolor=#d6d6d6
| 188127 ||  || — || February 7, 2002 || Socorro || LINEAR || — || align=right | 4.1 km || 
|-id=128 bgcolor=#d6d6d6
| 188128 ||  || — || February 7, 2002 || Socorro || LINEAR || — || align=right | 5.8 km || 
|-id=129 bgcolor=#d6d6d6
| 188129 ||  || — || February 7, 2002 || Socorro || LINEAR || HYG || align=right | 3.7 km || 
|-id=130 bgcolor=#E9E9E9
| 188130 ||  || — || February 8, 2002 || Socorro || LINEAR || — || align=right | 3.9 km || 
|-id=131 bgcolor=#d6d6d6
| 188131 ||  || — || February 10, 2002 || Socorro || LINEAR || — || align=right | 3.4 km || 
|-id=132 bgcolor=#d6d6d6
| 188132 ||  || — || February 7, 2002 || Socorro || LINEAR || KOR || align=right | 2.0 km || 
|-id=133 bgcolor=#d6d6d6
| 188133 ||  || — || February 10, 2002 || Socorro || LINEAR || TEL || align=right | 2.2 km || 
|-id=134 bgcolor=#d6d6d6
| 188134 ||  || — || February 11, 2002 || Kitt Peak || Spacewatch || THM || align=right | 3.6 km || 
|-id=135 bgcolor=#d6d6d6
| 188135 ||  || — || February 11, 2002 || Socorro || LINEAR || — || align=right | 5.5 km || 
|-id=136 bgcolor=#d6d6d6
| 188136 ||  || — || February 11, 2002 || Socorro || LINEAR || 627 || align=right | 5.8 km || 
|-id=137 bgcolor=#d6d6d6
| 188137 ||  || — || February 13, 2002 || Kitt Peak || Spacewatch || — || align=right | 3.4 km || 
|-id=138 bgcolor=#d6d6d6
| 188138 ||  || — || February 12, 2002 || Socorro || LINEAR || — || align=right | 4.5 km || 
|-id=139 bgcolor=#d6d6d6
| 188139 Stanbridge ||  ||  || February 6, 2002 || Kitt Peak || M. W. Buie || — || align=right | 3.5 km || 
|-id=140 bgcolor=#d6d6d6
| 188140 ||  || — || March 14, 2002 || Palomar || NEAT || — || align=right | 4.5 km || 
|-id=141 bgcolor=#d6d6d6
| 188141 ||  || — || March 9, 2002 || Kitt Peak || Spacewatch || EOS || align=right | 2.3 km || 
|-id=142 bgcolor=#E9E9E9
| 188142 ||  || — || March 12, 2002 || Socorro || LINEAR || — || align=right | 3.7 km || 
|-id=143 bgcolor=#d6d6d6
| 188143 ||  || — || March 12, 2002 || Palomar || NEAT || THM || align=right | 3.2 km || 
|-id=144 bgcolor=#d6d6d6
| 188144 ||  || — || March 13, 2002 || Socorro || LINEAR || — || align=right | 3.4 km || 
|-id=145 bgcolor=#d6d6d6
| 188145 ||  || — || March 13, 2002 || Palomar || NEAT || — || align=right | 4.3 km || 
|-id=146 bgcolor=#d6d6d6
| 188146 ||  || — || March 12, 2002 || Socorro || LINEAR || — || align=right | 5.1 km || 
|-id=147 bgcolor=#d6d6d6
| 188147 ||  || — || March 11, 2002 || Kitt Peak || Spacewatch || THM || align=right | 3.6 km || 
|-id=148 bgcolor=#d6d6d6
| 188148 ||  || — || March 20, 2002 || Socorro || LINEAR || — || align=right | 6.2 km || 
|-id=149 bgcolor=#d6d6d6
| 188149 ||  || — || March 20, 2002 || Palomar || NEAT || EOS || align=right | 2.8 km || 
|-id=150 bgcolor=#d6d6d6
| 188150 ||  || — || March 30, 2002 || Palomar || NEAT || — || align=right | 4.3 km || 
|-id=151 bgcolor=#d6d6d6
| 188151 ||  || — || March 18, 2002 || Socorro || LINEAR || — || align=right | 6.7 km || 
|-id=152 bgcolor=#d6d6d6
| 188152 || 2002 GK || — || April 2, 2002 || Kleť || Kleť Obs. || — || align=right | 4.3 km || 
|-id=153 bgcolor=#d6d6d6
| 188153 ||  || — || April 15, 2002 || Socorro || LINEAR || — || align=right | 5.7 km || 
|-id=154 bgcolor=#d6d6d6
| 188154 ||  || — || April 4, 2002 || Kitt Peak || Spacewatch || THM || align=right | 3.0 km || 
|-id=155 bgcolor=#d6d6d6
| 188155 ||  || — || April 4, 2002 || Palomar || NEAT || — || align=right | 4.6 km || 
|-id=156 bgcolor=#d6d6d6
| 188156 ||  || — || April 10, 2002 || Socorro || LINEAR || — || align=right | 5.5 km || 
|-id=157 bgcolor=#d6d6d6
| 188157 ||  || — || April 9, 2002 || Palomar || NEAT || — || align=right | 5.0 km || 
|-id=158 bgcolor=#d6d6d6
| 188158 ||  || — || April 10, 2002 || Palomar || NEAT || — || align=right | 4.4 km || 
|-id=159 bgcolor=#d6d6d6
| 188159 ||  || — || April 10, 2002 || Socorro || LINEAR || — || align=right | 3.8 km || 
|-id=160 bgcolor=#d6d6d6
| 188160 ||  || — || April 11, 2002 || Socorro || LINEAR || — || align=right | 5.5 km || 
|-id=161 bgcolor=#d6d6d6
| 188161 ||  || — || April 11, 2002 || Palomar || NEAT || — || align=right | 4.4 km || 
|-id=162 bgcolor=#d6d6d6
| 188162 ||  || — || April 11, 2002 || Anderson Mesa || LONEOS || MEL || align=right | 6.7 km || 
|-id=163 bgcolor=#d6d6d6
| 188163 ||  || — || April 10, 2002 || Socorro || LINEAR || — || align=right | 4.6 km || 
|-id=164 bgcolor=#d6d6d6
| 188164 ||  || — || April 10, 2002 || Socorro || LINEAR || VER || align=right | 5.0 km || 
|-id=165 bgcolor=#d6d6d6
| 188165 ||  || — || April 11, 2002 || Socorro || LINEAR || THB || align=right | 5.5 km || 
|-id=166 bgcolor=#d6d6d6
| 188166 ||  || — || April 12, 2002 || Socorro || LINEAR || HYG || align=right | 4.6 km || 
|-id=167 bgcolor=#d6d6d6
| 188167 ||  || — || April 12, 2002 || Socorro || LINEAR || — || align=right | 4.2 km || 
|-id=168 bgcolor=#d6d6d6
| 188168 ||  || — || April 14, 2002 || Palomar || NEAT || EOS || align=right | 3.1 km || 
|-id=169 bgcolor=#d6d6d6
| 188169 ||  || — || April 14, 2002 || Socorro || LINEAR || — || align=right | 4.3 km || 
|-id=170 bgcolor=#d6d6d6
| 188170 ||  || — || April 14, 2002 || Palomar || NEAT || ELF || align=right | 6.3 km || 
|-id=171 bgcolor=#d6d6d6
| 188171 ||  || — || April 11, 2002 || Palomar || NEAT || — || align=right | 4.7 km || 
|-id=172 bgcolor=#d6d6d6
| 188172 ||  || — || April 22, 2002 || Socorro || LINEAR || EUP || align=right | 7.1 km || 
|-id=173 bgcolor=#d6d6d6
| 188173 ||  || — || April 17, 2002 || Socorro || LINEAR || THM || align=right | 3.8 km || 
|-id=174 bgcolor=#FFC2E0
| 188174 || 2002 JC || — || May 1, 2002 || Socorro || LINEAR || ATE +1km || align=right | 1.2 km || 
|-id=175 bgcolor=#d6d6d6
| 188175 ||  || — || May 5, 2002 || Palomar || NEAT || — || align=right | 4.8 km || 
|-id=176 bgcolor=#d6d6d6
| 188176 ||  || — || May 5, 2002 || Socorro || LINEAR || EUP || align=right | 7.1 km || 
|-id=177 bgcolor=#d6d6d6
| 188177 ||  || — || May 9, 2002 || Socorro || LINEAR || MEL || align=right | 6.6 km || 
|-id=178 bgcolor=#d6d6d6
| 188178 ||  || — || May 8, 2002 || Socorro || LINEAR || — || align=right | 6.8 km || 
|-id=179 bgcolor=#d6d6d6
| 188179 ||  || — || May 11, 2002 || Socorro || LINEAR || LIX || align=right | 5.7 km || 
|-id=180 bgcolor=#d6d6d6
| 188180 ||  || — || May 11, 2002 || Socorro || LINEAR || — || align=right | 6.2 km || 
|-id=181 bgcolor=#d6d6d6
| 188181 ||  || — || May 14, 2002 || Palomar || NEAT || — || align=right | 6.0 km || 
|-id=182 bgcolor=#d6d6d6
| 188182 ||  || — || May 3, 2002 || Palomar || NEAT || ALA || align=right | 7.9 km || 
|-id=183 bgcolor=#d6d6d6
| 188183 ||  || — || May 5, 2002 || Palomar || NEAT || EUP || align=right | 6.5 km || 
|-id=184 bgcolor=#d6d6d6
| 188184 ||  || — || May 6, 2002 || Palomar || NEAT || — || align=right | 5.6 km || 
|-id=185 bgcolor=#d6d6d6
| 188185 ||  || — || May 14, 2002 || Palomar || NEAT || ALA || align=right | 5.3 km || 
|-id=186 bgcolor=#d6d6d6
| 188186 ||  || — || June 6, 2002 || Socorro || LINEAR || THB || align=right | 5.9 km || 
|-id=187 bgcolor=#d6d6d6
| 188187 ||  || — || June 7, 2002 || Socorro || LINEAR || THB || align=right | 7.7 km || 
|-id=188 bgcolor=#d6d6d6
| 188188 ||  || — || July 9, 2002 || Socorro || LINEAR || HIL || align=right | 7.6 km || 
|-id=189 bgcolor=#fefefe
| 188189 ||  || — || August 10, 2002 || Socorro || LINEAR || — || align=right | 1.5 km || 
|-id=190 bgcolor=#fefefe
| 188190 ||  || — || August 8, 2002 || Palomar || S. F. Hönig || — || align=right | 1.1 km || 
|-id=191 bgcolor=#fefefe
| 188191 ||  || — || August 26, 2002 || Palomar || NEAT || FLO || align=right | 1.1 km || 
|-id=192 bgcolor=#fefefe
| 188192 ||  || — || August 27, 2002 || Palomar || NEAT || FLO || align=right data-sort-value="0.93" | 930 m || 
|-id=193 bgcolor=#fefefe
| 188193 ||  || — || August 29, 2002 || Palomar || S. F. Hönig || — || align=right data-sort-value="0.83" | 830 m || 
|-id=194 bgcolor=#fefefe
| 188194 ||  || — || September 4, 2002 || Anderson Mesa || LONEOS || FLO || align=right | 1.2 km || 
|-id=195 bgcolor=#fefefe
| 188195 ||  || — || September 4, 2002 || Anderson Mesa || LONEOS || — || align=right | 1.1 km || 
|-id=196 bgcolor=#fefefe
| 188196 ||  || — || September 5, 2002 || Anderson Mesa || LONEOS || FLO || align=right | 1.0 km || 
|-id=197 bgcolor=#fefefe
| 188197 ||  || — || September 5, 2002 || Socorro || LINEAR || — || align=right data-sort-value="0.93" | 930 m || 
|-id=198 bgcolor=#fefefe
| 188198 ||  || — || September 5, 2002 || Anderson Mesa || LONEOS || FLO || align=right | 1.7 km || 
|-id=199 bgcolor=#fefefe
| 188199 ||  || — || September 5, 2002 || Socorro || LINEAR || — || align=right data-sort-value="0.83" | 830 m || 
|-id=200 bgcolor=#fefefe
| 188200 ||  || — || September 6, 2002 || Socorro || LINEAR || — || align=right | 1.5 km || 
|}

188201–188300 

|-bgcolor=#fefefe
| 188201 ||  || — || September 11, 2002 || Palomar || NEAT || — || align=right | 1.0 km || 
|-id=202 bgcolor=#fefefe
| 188202 ||  || — || September 13, 2002 || Palomar || NEAT || — || align=right data-sort-value="0.93" | 930 m || 
|-id=203 bgcolor=#fefefe
| 188203 ||  || — || September 12, 2002 || Haleakala || NEAT || FLO || align=right | 1.2 km || 
|-id=204 bgcolor=#fefefe
| 188204 ||  || — || September 14, 2002 || Haleakala || NEAT || — || align=right | 1.1 km || 
|-id=205 bgcolor=#fefefe
| 188205 ||  || — || September 15, 2002 || Palomar || R. Matson || V || align=right data-sort-value="0.72" | 720 m || 
|-id=206 bgcolor=#fefefe
| 188206 ||  || — || September 14, 2002 || Palomar || NEAT || — || align=right data-sort-value="0.91" | 910 m || 
|-id=207 bgcolor=#fefefe
| 188207 ||  || — || September 27, 2002 || Palomar || NEAT || — || align=right | 1.5 km || 
|-id=208 bgcolor=#fefefe
| 188208 ||  || — || September 28, 2002 || Palomar || NEAT || — || align=right data-sort-value="0.90" | 900 m || 
|-id=209 bgcolor=#fefefe
| 188209 ||  || — || September 30, 2002 || Kleť || Kleť Obs. || MAS || align=right | 1.0 km || 
|-id=210 bgcolor=#fefefe
| 188210 ||  || — || September 17, 2002 || Palomar || NEAT || — || align=right | 1.8 km || 
|-id=211 bgcolor=#fefefe
| 188211 ||  || — || September 30, 2002 || Haleakala || NEAT || FLO || align=right data-sort-value="0.97" | 970 m || 
|-id=212 bgcolor=#fefefe
| 188212 ||  || — || October 2, 2002 || Socorro || LINEAR || FLO || align=right data-sort-value="0.92" | 920 m || 
|-id=213 bgcolor=#fefefe
| 188213 ||  || — || October 2, 2002 || Socorro || LINEAR || FLO || align=right data-sort-value="0.85" | 850 m || 
|-id=214 bgcolor=#fefefe
| 188214 ||  || — || October 2, 2002 || Socorro || LINEAR || — || align=right | 1.2 km || 
|-id=215 bgcolor=#fefefe
| 188215 ||  || — || October 2, 2002 || Socorro || LINEAR || NYS || align=right data-sort-value="0.82" | 820 m || 
|-id=216 bgcolor=#fefefe
| 188216 ||  || — || October 2, 2002 || Socorro || LINEAR || — || align=right | 1.2 km || 
|-id=217 bgcolor=#fefefe
| 188217 ||  || — || October 2, 2002 || Socorro || LINEAR || FLO || align=right | 1.9 km || 
|-id=218 bgcolor=#fefefe
| 188218 ||  || — || October 2, 2002 || Socorro || LINEAR || — || align=right | 1.1 km || 
|-id=219 bgcolor=#fefefe
| 188219 ||  || — || October 2, 2002 || Socorro || LINEAR || FLO || align=right | 1.3 km || 
|-id=220 bgcolor=#fefefe
| 188220 ||  || — || October 3, 2002 || Socorro || LINEAR || — || align=right data-sort-value="0.90" | 900 m || 
|-id=221 bgcolor=#E9E9E9
| 188221 ||  || — || October 4, 2002 || Socorro || LINEAR || — || align=right | 1.3 km || 
|-id=222 bgcolor=#fefefe
| 188222 ||  || — || October 3, 2002 || Socorro || LINEAR || NYS || align=right | 2.9 km || 
|-id=223 bgcolor=#fefefe
| 188223 ||  || — || October 4, 2002 || Socorro || LINEAR || — || align=right | 1.5 km || 
|-id=224 bgcolor=#fefefe
| 188224 ||  || — || October 4, 2002 || Socorro || LINEAR || — || align=right | 1.4 km || 
|-id=225 bgcolor=#fefefe
| 188225 ||  || — || October 4, 2002 || Socorro || LINEAR || FLO || align=right data-sort-value="0.80" | 800 m || 
|-id=226 bgcolor=#fefefe
| 188226 ||  || — || October 4, 2002 || Socorro || LINEAR || — || align=right | 1.5 km || 
|-id=227 bgcolor=#fefefe
| 188227 ||  || — || October 7, 2002 || Socorro || LINEAR || FLO || align=right | 1.8 km || 
|-id=228 bgcolor=#FA8072
| 188228 ||  || — || October 10, 2002 || Socorro || LINEAR || — || align=right | 1.4 km || 
|-id=229 bgcolor=#fefefe
| 188229 ||  || — || October 10, 2002 || Socorro || LINEAR || — || align=right | 1.4 km || 
|-id=230 bgcolor=#fefefe
| 188230 ||  || — || October 15, 2002 || Eskridge || Farpoint Obs. || V || align=right | 1.0 km || 
|-id=231 bgcolor=#fefefe
| 188231 ||  || — || October 10, 2002 || Apache Point || SDSS || — || align=right data-sort-value="0.98" | 980 m || 
|-id=232 bgcolor=#fefefe
| 188232 ||  || — || October 10, 2002 || Apache Point || SDSS || — || align=right data-sort-value="0.98" | 980 m || 
|-id=233 bgcolor=#fefefe
| 188233 ||  || — || October 30, 2002 || Palomar || NEAT || V || align=right data-sort-value="0.94" | 940 m || 
|-id=234 bgcolor=#C2FFFF
| 188234 ||  || — || October 30, 2002 || Palomar || NEAT || L5 || align=right | 9.7 km || 
|-id=235 bgcolor=#fefefe
| 188235 ||  || — || October 30, 2002 || Palomar || NEAT || NYS || align=right | 1.1 km || 
|-id=236 bgcolor=#FA8072
| 188236 || 2002 VY || — || November 1, 2002 || Socorro || LINEAR || — || align=right | 1.6 km || 
|-id=237 bgcolor=#fefefe
| 188237 ||  || — || November 5, 2002 || Socorro || LINEAR || FLO || align=right data-sort-value="0.90" | 900 m || 
|-id=238 bgcolor=#fefefe
| 188238 ||  || — || November 5, 2002 || Anderson Mesa || LONEOS || MAS || align=right | 1.5 km || 
|-id=239 bgcolor=#fefefe
| 188239 ||  || — || November 5, 2002 || Anderson Mesa || LONEOS || — || align=right | 1.2 km || 
|-id=240 bgcolor=#fefefe
| 188240 ||  || — || November 6, 2002 || Anderson Mesa || LONEOS || — || align=right | 1.1 km || 
|-id=241 bgcolor=#fefefe
| 188241 ||  || — || November 6, 2002 || Socorro || LINEAR || — || align=right | 1.2 km || 
|-id=242 bgcolor=#fefefe
| 188242 ||  || — || November 7, 2002 || Socorro || LINEAR || V || align=right data-sort-value="0.97" | 970 m || 
|-id=243 bgcolor=#E9E9E9
| 188243 ||  || — || November 7, 2002 || Socorro || LINEAR || — || align=right | 2.6 km || 
|-id=244 bgcolor=#fefefe
| 188244 ||  || — || November 7, 2002 || Socorro || LINEAR || V || align=right | 1.2 km || 
|-id=245 bgcolor=#fefefe
| 188245 ||  || — || November 13, 2002 || Palomar || NEAT || — || align=right | 1.1 km || 
|-id=246 bgcolor=#fefefe
| 188246 ||  || — || November 28, 2002 || Anderson Mesa || LONEOS || FLO || align=right data-sort-value="0.99" | 990 m || 
|-id=247 bgcolor=#C2FFFF
| 188247 ||  || — || November 24, 2002 || Palomar || NEAT || L5 || align=right | 15 km || 
|-id=248 bgcolor=#E9E9E9
| 188248 ||  || — || December 5, 2002 || Socorro || LINEAR || MIT || align=right | 4.7 km || 
|-id=249 bgcolor=#fefefe
| 188249 ||  || — || December 10, 2002 || Palomar || NEAT || — || align=right | 1.5 km || 
|-id=250 bgcolor=#fefefe
| 188250 ||  || — || December 11, 2002 || Palomar || NEAT || — || align=right | 1.4 km || 
|-id=251 bgcolor=#E9E9E9
| 188251 ||  || — || December 10, 2002 || Socorro || LINEAR || — || align=right | 1.6 km || 
|-id=252 bgcolor=#E9E9E9
| 188252 ||  || — || December 11, 2002 || Socorro || LINEAR || — || align=right | 2.4 km || 
|-id=253 bgcolor=#fefefe
| 188253 ||  || — || December 11, 2002 || Socorro || LINEAR || V || align=right | 1.1 km || 
|-id=254 bgcolor=#fefefe
| 188254 ||  || — || December 11, 2002 || Socorro || LINEAR || — || align=right | 1.5 km || 
|-id=255 bgcolor=#E9E9E9
| 188255 ||  || — || December 15, 2002 || Haleakala || NEAT || EUN || align=right | 2.6 km || 
|-id=256 bgcolor=#fefefe
| 188256 Stothoff ||  ||  || December 7, 2002 || Kitt Peak || M. W. Buie || V || align=right | 1.2 km || 
|-id=257 bgcolor=#C2FFFF
| 188257 ||  || — || December 10, 2002 || Palomar || NEAT || L5 || align=right | 13 km || 
|-id=258 bgcolor=#E9E9E9
| 188258 ||  || — || December 30, 2002 || Socorro || LINEAR || — || align=right | 3.5 km || 
|-id=259 bgcolor=#E9E9E9
| 188259 ||  || — || December 31, 2002 || Socorro || LINEAR || — || align=right | 2.4 km || 
|-id=260 bgcolor=#fefefe
| 188260 ||  || — || December 31, 2002 || Socorro || LINEAR || — || align=right | 1.3 km || 
|-id=261 bgcolor=#fefefe
| 188261 ||  || — || December 31, 2002 || Socorro || LINEAR || NYS || align=right data-sort-value="0.93" | 930 m || 
|-id=262 bgcolor=#E9E9E9
| 188262 ||  || — || December 31, 2002 || Socorro || LINEAR || — || align=right | 1.6 km || 
|-id=263 bgcolor=#E9E9E9
| 188263 ||  || — || December 31, 2002 || Socorro || LINEAR || — || align=right | 1.6 km || 
|-id=264 bgcolor=#E9E9E9
| 188264 || 2003 AF || — || January 1, 2003 || Socorro || LINEAR || — || align=right | 1.7 km || 
|-id=265 bgcolor=#fefefe
| 188265 ||  || — || January 5, 2003 || Socorro || LINEAR || — || align=right | 1.6 km || 
|-id=266 bgcolor=#fefefe
| 188266 ||  || — || January 5, 2003 || Socorro || LINEAR || — || align=right | 1.6 km || 
|-id=267 bgcolor=#fefefe
| 188267 ||  || — || January 4, 2003 || Socorro || LINEAR || V || align=right data-sort-value="0.99" | 990 m || 
|-id=268 bgcolor=#fefefe
| 188268 ||  || — || January 4, 2003 || Socorro || LINEAR || V || align=right | 1.8 km || 
|-id=269 bgcolor=#E9E9E9
| 188269 ||  || — || January 5, 2003 || Socorro || LINEAR || ADE || align=right | 3.8 km || 
|-id=270 bgcolor=#E9E9E9
| 188270 ||  || — || January 5, 2003 || Kitt Peak || Spacewatch || — || align=right | 1.5 km || 
|-id=271 bgcolor=#E9E9E9
| 188271 ||  || — || January 7, 2003 || Socorro || LINEAR || — || align=right | 2.0 km || 
|-id=272 bgcolor=#FA8072
| 188272 ||  || — || January 7, 2003 || Socorro || LINEAR || — || align=right | 2.6 km || 
|-id=273 bgcolor=#fefefe
| 188273 ||  || — || January 5, 2003 || Socorro || LINEAR || V || align=right | 1.1 km || 
|-id=274 bgcolor=#E9E9E9
| 188274 ||  || — || January 5, 2003 || Socorro || LINEAR || EUN || align=right | 2.0 km || 
|-id=275 bgcolor=#fefefe
| 188275 ||  || — || January 5, 2003 || Socorro || LINEAR || — || align=right | 1.5 km || 
|-id=276 bgcolor=#E9E9E9
| 188276 ||  || — || January 5, 2003 || Socorro || LINEAR || — || align=right | 1.6 km || 
|-id=277 bgcolor=#E9E9E9
| 188277 ||  || — || January 5, 2003 || Socorro || LINEAR || — || align=right | 1.7 km || 
|-id=278 bgcolor=#E9E9E9
| 188278 ||  || — || January 10, 2003 || Socorro || LINEAR || KRM || align=right | 3.0 km || 
|-id=279 bgcolor=#E9E9E9
| 188279 ||  || — || January 10, 2003 || Kitt Peak || Spacewatch || — || align=right | 1.6 km || 
|-id=280 bgcolor=#E9E9E9
| 188280 ||  || — || January 12, 2003 || Kitt Peak || Spacewatch || EUN || align=right | 2.4 km || 
|-id=281 bgcolor=#E9E9E9
| 188281 ||  || — || January 1, 2003 || Socorro || LINEAR || — || align=right | 1.6 km || 
|-id=282 bgcolor=#E9E9E9
| 188282 ||  || — || January 13, 2003 || Socorro || LINEAR || — || align=right | 3.5 km || 
|-id=283 bgcolor=#E9E9E9
| 188283 ||  || — || January 26, 2003 || Kitt Peak || Spacewatch || — || align=right | 2.0 km || 
|-id=284 bgcolor=#fefefe
| 188284 ||  || — || January 27, 2003 || Socorro || LINEAR || — || align=right | 1.5 km || 
|-id=285 bgcolor=#E9E9E9
| 188285 ||  || — || January 27, 2003 || Socorro || LINEAR || — || align=right | 1.2 km || 
|-id=286 bgcolor=#E9E9E9
| 188286 ||  || — || January 27, 2003 || Socorro || LINEAR || — || align=right | 1.8 km || 
|-id=287 bgcolor=#E9E9E9
| 188287 ||  || — || January 27, 2003 || Anderson Mesa || LONEOS || — || align=right | 1.8 km || 
|-id=288 bgcolor=#E9E9E9
| 188288 ||  || — || January 27, 2003 || Socorro || LINEAR || — || align=right | 2.2 km || 
|-id=289 bgcolor=#E9E9E9
| 188289 ||  || — || January 30, 2003 || Anderson Mesa || LONEOS || MIS || align=right | 3.7 km || 
|-id=290 bgcolor=#E9E9E9
| 188290 ||  || — || January 30, 2003 || Anderson Mesa || LONEOS || — || align=right | 2.1 km || 
|-id=291 bgcolor=#fefefe
| 188291 ||  || — || January 27, 2003 || Socorro || LINEAR || — || align=right | 1.5 km || 
|-id=292 bgcolor=#E9E9E9
| 188292 ||  || — || January 28, 2003 || Socorro || LINEAR || EUN || align=right | 2.1 km || 
|-id=293 bgcolor=#E9E9E9
| 188293 ||  || — || January 29, 2003 || Palomar || NEAT || — || align=right | 2.6 km || 
|-id=294 bgcolor=#E9E9E9
| 188294 ||  || — || January 26, 2003 || Anderson Mesa || LONEOS || — || align=right | 3.0 km || 
|-id=295 bgcolor=#E9E9E9
| 188295 ||  || — || February 2, 2003 || Socorro || LINEAR || — || align=right | 2.4 km || 
|-id=296 bgcolor=#E9E9E9
| 188296 ||  || — || February 1, 2003 || Socorro || LINEAR || — || align=right | 1.8 km || 
|-id=297 bgcolor=#E9E9E9
| 188297 ||  || — || February 6, 2003 || Kitt Peak || Spacewatch || — || align=right | 2.7 km || 
|-id=298 bgcolor=#E9E9E9
| 188298 ||  || — || March 6, 2003 || Socorro || LINEAR || — || align=right | 3.4 km || 
|-id=299 bgcolor=#E9E9E9
| 188299 ||  || — || March 6, 2003 || Anderson Mesa || LONEOS || — || align=right | 4.2 km || 
|-id=300 bgcolor=#E9E9E9
| 188300 ||  || — || March 6, 2003 || Anderson Mesa || LONEOS || — || align=right | 3.0 km || 
|}

188301–188400 

|-bgcolor=#E9E9E9
| 188301 ||  || — || March 7, 2003 || Socorro || LINEAR || — || align=right | 4.3 km || 
|-id=302 bgcolor=#E9E9E9
| 188302 ||  || — || March 7, 2003 || Socorro || LINEAR || MAR || align=right | 1.8 km || 
|-id=303 bgcolor=#E9E9E9
| 188303 ||  || — || March 7, 2003 || Socorro || LINEAR || — || align=right | 2.7 km || 
|-id=304 bgcolor=#E9E9E9
| 188304 ||  || — || March 10, 2003 || Kitt Peak || Spacewatch || NEM || align=right | 2.6 km || 
|-id=305 bgcolor=#E9E9E9
| 188305 ||  || — || March 11, 2003 || Palomar || NEAT || EUN || align=right | 1.7 km || 
|-id=306 bgcolor=#E9E9E9
| 188306 ||  || — || March 9, 2003 || Socorro || LINEAR || — || align=right | 3.7 km || 
|-id=307 bgcolor=#E9E9E9
| 188307 ||  || — || March 12, 2003 || Palomar || NEAT || — || align=right | 2.5 km || 
|-id=308 bgcolor=#E9E9E9
| 188308 ||  || — || March 21, 2003 || Palomar || NEAT || MAR || align=right | 1.9 km || 
|-id=309 bgcolor=#E9E9E9
| 188309 ||  || — || March 22, 2003 || Haleakala || NEAT || — || align=right | 3.8 km || 
|-id=310 bgcolor=#E9E9E9
| 188310 ||  || — || March 23, 2003 || Kitt Peak || Spacewatch || — || align=right | 2.5 km || 
|-id=311 bgcolor=#E9E9E9
| 188311 ||  || — || March 25, 2003 || Palomar || NEAT || — || align=right | 3.3 km || 
|-id=312 bgcolor=#E9E9E9
| 188312 ||  || — || March 23, 2003 || Kitt Peak || Spacewatch || — || align=right | 2.4 km || 
|-id=313 bgcolor=#d6d6d6
| 188313 ||  || — || March 23, 2003 || Kitt Peak || Spacewatch || — || align=right | 6.5 km || 
|-id=314 bgcolor=#d6d6d6
| 188314 ||  || — || March 26, 2003 || Palomar || NEAT || — || align=right | 3.7 km || 
|-id=315 bgcolor=#E9E9E9
| 188315 ||  || — || March 26, 2003 || Palomar || NEAT || — || align=right | 3.4 km || 
|-id=316 bgcolor=#d6d6d6
| 188316 ||  || — || March 29, 2003 || Anderson Mesa || LONEOS || — || align=right | 5.0 km || 
|-id=317 bgcolor=#E9E9E9
| 188317 ||  || — || March 27, 2003 || Palomar || NEAT || — || align=right | 3.2 km || 
|-id=318 bgcolor=#E9E9E9
| 188318 ||  || — || April 2, 2003 || Haleakala || NEAT || DOR || align=right | 2.7 km || 
|-id=319 bgcolor=#E9E9E9
| 188319 ||  || — || April 5, 2003 || Kitt Peak || Spacewatch || — || align=right | 3.9 km || 
|-id=320 bgcolor=#d6d6d6
| 188320 ||  || — || April 24, 2003 || Kitt Peak || Spacewatch || — || align=right | 3.4 km || 
|-id=321 bgcolor=#E9E9E9
| 188321 ||  || — || April 24, 2003 || Anderson Mesa || LONEOS || ADE || align=right | 3.7 km || 
|-id=322 bgcolor=#fefefe
| 188322 ||  || — || April 25, 2003 || Kitt Peak || Spacewatch || H || align=right | 1.1 km || 
|-id=323 bgcolor=#E9E9E9
| 188323 ||  || — || April 25, 2003 || Kitt Peak || Spacewatch || — || align=right | 4.6 km || 
|-id=324 bgcolor=#E9E9E9
| 188324 ||  || — || May 9, 2003 || Haleakala || NEAT || PAL || align=right | 4.5 km || 
|-id=325 bgcolor=#E9E9E9
| 188325 ||  || — || May 28, 2003 || Haleakala || NEAT || — || align=right | 3.9 km || 
|-id=326 bgcolor=#d6d6d6
| 188326 ||  || — || July 2, 2003 || Socorro || LINEAR || — || align=right | 4.9 km || 
|-id=327 bgcolor=#d6d6d6
| 188327 ||  || — || July 4, 2003 || Socorro || LINEAR || — || align=right | 5.5 km || 
|-id=328 bgcolor=#d6d6d6
| 188328 ||  || — || July 2, 2003 || Anderson Mesa || LONEOS || — || align=right | 9.3 km || 
|-id=329 bgcolor=#d6d6d6
| 188329 ||  || — || July 22, 2003 || Haleakala || NEAT || — || align=right | 5.1 km || 
|-id=330 bgcolor=#d6d6d6
| 188330 ||  || — || July 22, 2003 || Socorro || LINEAR || — || align=right | 4.8 km || 
|-id=331 bgcolor=#d6d6d6
| 188331 ||  || — || July 24, 2003 || Palomar || NEAT || — || align=right | 4.3 km || 
|-id=332 bgcolor=#d6d6d6
| 188332 ||  || — || August 19, 2003 || Campo Imperatore || CINEOS || — || align=right | 3.4 km || 
|-id=333 bgcolor=#fefefe
| 188333 ||  || — || August 21, 2003 || Haleakala || NEAT || H || align=right data-sort-value="0.94" | 940 m || 
|-id=334 bgcolor=#fefefe
| 188334 ||  || — || August 24, 2003 || Socorro || LINEAR || H || align=right data-sort-value="0.98" | 980 m || 
|-id=335 bgcolor=#d6d6d6
| 188335 ||  || — || August 20, 2003 || Palomar || NEAT || — || align=right | 4.8 km || 
|-id=336 bgcolor=#fefefe
| 188336 ||  || — || August 23, 2003 || Socorro || LINEAR || — || align=right | 1.1 km || 
|-id=337 bgcolor=#d6d6d6
| 188337 ||  || — || August 23, 2003 || Palomar || NEAT || — || align=right | 5.4 km || 
|-id=338 bgcolor=#fefefe
| 188338 ||  || — || August 25, 2003 || Palomar || NEAT || H || align=right data-sort-value="0.82" | 820 m || 
|-id=339 bgcolor=#FA8072
| 188339 ||  || — || September 7, 2003 || Socorro || LINEAR || H || align=right | 1.2 km || 
|-id=340 bgcolor=#d6d6d6
| 188340 ||  || — || September 18, 2003 || Campo Imperatore || CINEOS || TIR || align=right | 5.9 km || 
|-id=341 bgcolor=#d6d6d6
| 188341 ||  || — || September 17, 2003 || Socorro || LINEAR || SHU3:2 || align=right | 9.6 km || 
|-id=342 bgcolor=#d6d6d6
| 188342 ||  || — || September 18, 2003 || Palomar || NEAT || 3:2 || align=right | 6.3 km || 
|-id=343 bgcolor=#d6d6d6
| 188343 ||  || — || September 16, 2003 || Palomar || NEAT || — || align=right | 7.5 km || 
|-id=344 bgcolor=#d6d6d6
| 188344 ||  || — || September 18, 2003 || Socorro || LINEAR || — || align=right | 4.6 km || 
|-id=345 bgcolor=#d6d6d6
| 188345 ||  || — || September 23, 2003 || Palomar || NEAT || EOS || align=right | 3.5 km || 
|-id=346 bgcolor=#d6d6d6
| 188346 ||  || — || September 17, 2003 || Palomar || NEAT || — || align=right | 6.6 km || 
|-id=347 bgcolor=#d6d6d6
| 188347 ||  || — || September 28, 2003 || Socorro || LINEAR || HYG || align=right | 4.6 km || 
|-id=348 bgcolor=#d6d6d6
| 188348 ||  || — || September 27, 2003 || Apache Point || SDSS || HIL3:2 || align=right | 8.4 km || 
|-id=349 bgcolor=#FA8072
| 188349 ||  || — || October 14, 2003 || Socorro || LINEAR || — || align=right | 1.6 km || 
|-id=350 bgcolor=#fefefe
| 188350 ||  || — || October 17, 2003 || Palomar || NEAT || H || align=right | 1.1 km || 
|-id=351 bgcolor=#d6d6d6
| 188351 ||  || — || November 16, 2003 || Catalina || CSS || HIL3:2 || align=right | 8.4 km || 
|-id=352 bgcolor=#d6d6d6
| 188352 ||  || — || December 3, 2003 || Socorro || LINEAR || — || align=right | 5.2 km || 
|-id=353 bgcolor=#fefefe
| 188353 ||  || — || December 1, 2003 || Kitt Peak || Spacewatch || — || align=right data-sort-value="0.87" | 870 m || 
|-id=354 bgcolor=#fefefe
| 188354 ||  || — || December 17, 2003 || Anderson Mesa || LONEOS || — || align=right | 1.7 km || 
|-id=355 bgcolor=#fefefe
| 188355 ||  || — || December 19, 2003 || Kitt Peak || Spacewatch || MAS || align=right data-sort-value="0.79" | 790 m || 
|-id=356 bgcolor=#fefefe
| 188356 ||  || — || December 18, 2003 || Socorro || LINEAR || — || align=right data-sort-value="0.98" | 980 m || 
|-id=357 bgcolor=#fefefe
| 188357 ||  || — || December 18, 2003 || Socorro || LINEAR || MAS || align=right | 1.1 km || 
|-id=358 bgcolor=#E9E9E9
| 188358 ||  || — || December 20, 2003 || Socorro || LINEAR || — || align=right | 1.7 km || 
|-id=359 bgcolor=#fefefe
| 188359 ||  || — || December 27, 2003 || Socorro || LINEAR || — || align=right | 1.2 km || 
|-id=360 bgcolor=#fefefe
| 188360 ||  || — || December 19, 2003 || Kitt Peak || Spacewatch || FLO || align=right data-sort-value="0.89" | 890 m || 
|-id=361 bgcolor=#fefefe
| 188361 ||  || — || January 13, 2004 || Anderson Mesa || LONEOS || — || align=right | 1.2 km || 
|-id=362 bgcolor=#fefefe
| 188362 ||  || — || January 15, 2004 || Kitt Peak || Spacewatch || — || align=right data-sort-value="0.76" | 760 m || 
|-id=363 bgcolor=#fefefe
| 188363 ||  || — || January 16, 2004 || Kitt Peak || Spacewatch || NYS || align=right data-sort-value="0.83" | 830 m || 
|-id=364 bgcolor=#fefefe
| 188364 ||  || — || January 18, 2004 || Palomar || NEAT || FLO || align=right data-sort-value="0.97" | 970 m || 
|-id=365 bgcolor=#fefefe
| 188365 ||  || — || January 18, 2004 || Palomar || NEAT || — || align=right | 1.1 km || 
|-id=366 bgcolor=#fefefe
| 188366 ||  || — || January 22, 2004 || Socorro || LINEAR || V || align=right data-sort-value="0.99" | 990 m || 
|-id=367 bgcolor=#fefefe
| 188367 ||  || — || January 22, 2004 || Socorro || LINEAR || — || align=right | 1.6 km || 
|-id=368 bgcolor=#fefefe
| 188368 ||  || — || January 22, 2004 || Socorro || LINEAR || — || align=right | 1.2 km || 
|-id=369 bgcolor=#fefefe
| 188369 ||  || — || January 23, 2004 || Socorro || LINEAR || FLO || align=right data-sort-value="0.97" | 970 m || 
|-id=370 bgcolor=#fefefe
| 188370 ||  || — || January 28, 2004 || Socorro || LINEAR || — || align=right | 1.0 km || 
|-id=371 bgcolor=#fefefe
| 188371 ||  || — || January 28, 2004 || Socorro || LINEAR || — || align=right data-sort-value="0.86" | 860 m || 
|-id=372 bgcolor=#fefefe
| 188372 ||  || — || January 31, 2004 || Catalina || CSS || PHO || align=right | 1.9 km || 
|-id=373 bgcolor=#C2FFFF
| 188373 ||  || — || January 17, 2004 || Kitt Peak || Spacewatch || L5 || align=right | 12 km || 
|-id=374 bgcolor=#fefefe
| 188374 ||  || — || February 10, 2004 || Palomar || NEAT || — || align=right data-sort-value="0.84" | 840 m || 
|-id=375 bgcolor=#fefefe
| 188375 ||  || — || February 11, 2004 || Anderson Mesa || LONEOS || NYS || align=right data-sort-value="0.79" | 790 m || 
|-id=376 bgcolor=#fefefe
| 188376 ||  || — || February 11, 2004 || Palomar || NEAT || — || align=right | 1.3 km || 
|-id=377 bgcolor=#fefefe
| 188377 ||  || — || February 12, 2004 || Palomar || NEAT || — || align=right | 1.3 km || 
|-id=378 bgcolor=#fefefe
| 188378 ||  || — || February 10, 2004 || Palomar || NEAT || — || align=right | 1.2 km || 
|-id=379 bgcolor=#fefefe
| 188379 ||  || — || February 11, 2004 || Kitt Peak || Spacewatch || NYS || align=right data-sort-value="0.80" | 800 m || 
|-id=380 bgcolor=#fefefe
| 188380 ||  || — || February 11, 2004 || Catalina || CSS || — || align=right | 1.4 km || 
|-id=381 bgcolor=#fefefe
| 188381 ||  || — || February 12, 2004 || Kitt Peak || Spacewatch || NYS || align=right data-sort-value="0.94" | 940 m || 
|-id=382 bgcolor=#fefefe
| 188382 ||  || — || February 14, 2004 || Kitt Peak || Spacewatch || FLO || align=right data-sort-value="0.75" | 750 m || 
|-id=383 bgcolor=#fefefe
| 188383 ||  || — || February 14, 2004 || Kitt Peak || Spacewatch || — || align=right | 1.2 km || 
|-id=384 bgcolor=#fefefe
| 188384 ||  || — || February 15, 2004 || Catalina || CSS || — || align=right | 1.3 km || 
|-id=385 bgcolor=#fefefe
| 188385 ||  || — || February 13, 2004 || Palomar || NEAT || — || align=right | 1.3 km || 
|-id=386 bgcolor=#fefefe
| 188386 ||  || — || February 14, 2004 || Kitt Peak || Spacewatch || NYS || align=right | 2.4 km || 
|-id=387 bgcolor=#fefefe
| 188387 ||  || — || February 15, 2004 || Socorro || LINEAR || — || align=right | 2.1 km || 
|-id=388 bgcolor=#fefefe
| 188388 ||  || — || February 16, 2004 || Kitt Peak || Spacewatch || MAS || align=right | 1.1 km || 
|-id=389 bgcolor=#fefefe
| 188389 ||  || — || February 16, 2004 || Kitt Peak || Spacewatch || — || align=right | 1.2 km || 
|-id=390 bgcolor=#fefefe
| 188390 ||  || — || February 17, 2004 || Desert Eagle || W. K. Y. Yeung || — || align=right | 1.3 km || 
|-id=391 bgcolor=#fefefe
| 188391 ||  || — || February 18, 2004 || Kitt Peak || Spacewatch || — || align=right | 1.0 km || 
|-id=392 bgcolor=#fefefe
| 188392 ||  || — || February 17, 2004 || Socorro || LINEAR || ERI || align=right | 1.9 km || 
|-id=393 bgcolor=#fefefe
| 188393 ||  || — || February 17, 2004 || Socorro || LINEAR || FLO || align=right | 1.3 km || 
|-id=394 bgcolor=#E9E9E9
| 188394 ||  || — || February 19, 2004 || Socorro || LINEAR || WIT || align=right | 1.5 km || 
|-id=395 bgcolor=#fefefe
| 188395 ||  || — || February 22, 2004 || Kitt Peak || Spacewatch || V || align=right data-sort-value="0.86" | 860 m || 
|-id=396 bgcolor=#fefefe
| 188396 ||  || — || February 26, 2004 || Socorro || LINEAR || — || align=right | 1.0 km || 
|-id=397 bgcolor=#fefefe
| 188397 ||  || — || March 11, 2004 || Palomar || NEAT || V || align=right data-sort-value="0.98" | 980 m || 
|-id=398 bgcolor=#fefefe
| 188398 ||  || — || March 12, 2004 || Palomar || NEAT || — || align=right | 1.4 km || 
|-id=399 bgcolor=#fefefe
| 188399 ||  || — || March 13, 2004 || Palomar || NEAT || — || align=right | 1.4 km || 
|-id=400 bgcolor=#fefefe
| 188400 ||  || — || March 11, 2004 || Palomar || NEAT || NYS || align=right | 1.0 km || 
|}

188401–188500 

|-bgcolor=#fefefe
| 188401 ||  || — || March 15, 2004 || Socorro || LINEAR || MAS || align=right data-sort-value="0.93" | 930 m || 
|-id=402 bgcolor=#fefefe
| 188402 ||  || — || March 15, 2004 || Desert Eagle || W. K. Y. Yeung || MAS || align=right data-sort-value="0.98" | 980 m || 
|-id=403 bgcolor=#fefefe
| 188403 ||  || — || March 13, 2004 || Palomar || NEAT || V || align=right data-sort-value="0.92" | 920 m || 
|-id=404 bgcolor=#fefefe
| 188404 ||  || — || March 14, 2004 || Kitt Peak || Spacewatch || NYS || align=right data-sort-value="0.93" | 930 m || 
|-id=405 bgcolor=#fefefe
| 188405 ||  || — || March 15, 2004 || Socorro || LINEAR || NYS || align=right data-sort-value="0.92" | 920 m || 
|-id=406 bgcolor=#fefefe
| 188406 ||  || — || March 12, 2004 || Palomar || NEAT || NYS || align=right data-sort-value="0.98" | 980 m || 
|-id=407 bgcolor=#fefefe
| 188407 ||  || — || March 15, 2004 || Kitt Peak || Spacewatch || NYS || align=right data-sort-value="0.83" | 830 m || 
|-id=408 bgcolor=#fefefe
| 188408 ||  || — || March 15, 2004 || Catalina || CSS || FLO || align=right data-sort-value="0.95" | 950 m || 
|-id=409 bgcolor=#fefefe
| 188409 ||  || — || March 15, 2004 || Campo Imperatore || CINEOS || V || align=right data-sort-value="0.83" | 830 m || 
|-id=410 bgcolor=#fefefe
| 188410 ||  || — || March 14, 2004 || Kitt Peak || Spacewatch || — || align=right | 1.2 km || 
|-id=411 bgcolor=#E9E9E9
| 188411 ||  || — || March 15, 2004 || Socorro || LINEAR || — || align=right | 1.0 km || 
|-id=412 bgcolor=#fefefe
| 188412 ||  || — || March 15, 2004 || Catalina || CSS || NYS || align=right | 1.1 km || 
|-id=413 bgcolor=#fefefe
| 188413 ||  || — || March 15, 2004 || Socorro || LINEAR || V || align=right | 1.0 km || 
|-id=414 bgcolor=#fefefe
| 188414 ||  || — || March 15, 2004 || Kitt Peak || Spacewatch || — || align=right | 2.4 km || 
|-id=415 bgcolor=#fefefe
| 188415 || 2004 FF || — || March 16, 2004 || Desert Eagle || W. K. Y. Yeung || NYS || align=right data-sort-value="0.92" | 920 m || 
|-id=416 bgcolor=#d6d6d6
| 188416 ||  || — || March 16, 2004 || Catalina || CSS || — || align=right | 5.1 km || 
|-id=417 bgcolor=#fefefe
| 188417 ||  || — || March 17, 2004 || Socorro || LINEAR || MAS || align=right data-sort-value="0.96" | 960 m || 
|-id=418 bgcolor=#fefefe
| 188418 ||  || — || March 17, 2004 || Kitt Peak || Spacewatch || MAS || align=right data-sort-value="0.96" | 960 m || 
|-id=419 bgcolor=#fefefe
| 188419 ||  || — || March 16, 2004 || Kitt Peak || Spacewatch || — || align=right | 1.3 km || 
|-id=420 bgcolor=#fefefe
| 188420 ||  || — || March 18, 2004 || Socorro || LINEAR || — || align=right data-sort-value="0.98" | 980 m || 
|-id=421 bgcolor=#fefefe
| 188421 ||  || — || March 19, 2004 || Socorro || LINEAR || V || align=right data-sort-value="0.77" | 770 m || 
|-id=422 bgcolor=#fefefe
| 188422 ||  || — || March 17, 2004 || Socorro || LINEAR || MAS || align=right | 1.2 km || 
|-id=423 bgcolor=#fefefe
| 188423 ||  || — || March 19, 2004 || Socorro || LINEAR || — || align=right | 1.9 km || 
|-id=424 bgcolor=#fefefe
| 188424 ||  || — || March 22, 2004 || Socorro || LINEAR || NYS || align=right data-sort-value="0.85" | 850 m || 
|-id=425 bgcolor=#fefefe
| 188425 ||  || — || March 17, 2004 || Kitt Peak || Spacewatch || — || align=right | 1.4 km || 
|-id=426 bgcolor=#fefefe
| 188426 ||  || — || March 18, 2004 || Socorro || LINEAR || V || align=right | 1.3 km || 
|-id=427 bgcolor=#fefefe
| 188427 ||  || — || March 19, 2004 || Palomar || NEAT || FLO || align=right data-sort-value="0.91" | 910 m || 
|-id=428 bgcolor=#fefefe
| 188428 ||  || — || March 19, 2004 || Palomar || NEAT || — || align=right | 1.3 km || 
|-id=429 bgcolor=#fefefe
| 188429 ||  || — || March 19, 2004 || Socorro || LINEAR || — || align=right data-sort-value="0.93" | 930 m || 
|-id=430 bgcolor=#fefefe
| 188430 ||  || — || March 21, 2004 || Kitt Peak || Spacewatch || — || align=right | 1.4 km || 
|-id=431 bgcolor=#fefefe
| 188431 ||  || — || March 21, 2004 || Kitt Peak || Spacewatch || V || align=right | 1.0 km || 
|-id=432 bgcolor=#fefefe
| 188432 ||  || — || March 22, 2004 || Socorro || LINEAR || — || align=right | 1.1 km || 
|-id=433 bgcolor=#E9E9E9
| 188433 ||  || — || March 24, 2004 || Anderson Mesa || LONEOS || — || align=right | 1.3 km || 
|-id=434 bgcolor=#fefefe
| 188434 ||  || — || March 23, 2004 || Kitt Peak || Spacewatch || MAS || align=right | 1.1 km || 
|-id=435 bgcolor=#fefefe
| 188435 ||  || — || March 22, 2004 || Socorro || LINEAR || V || align=right data-sort-value="0.85" | 850 m || 
|-id=436 bgcolor=#fefefe
| 188436 ||  || — || March 23, 2004 || Kitt Peak || Spacewatch || — || align=right | 1.2 km || 
|-id=437 bgcolor=#fefefe
| 188437 ||  || — || March 26, 2004 || Socorro || LINEAR || — || align=right | 1.6 km || 
|-id=438 bgcolor=#fefefe
| 188438 ||  || — || March 27, 2004 || Socorro || LINEAR || — || align=right | 1.3 km || 
|-id=439 bgcolor=#fefefe
| 188439 ||  || — || March 27, 2004 || Kitt Peak || Spacewatch || — || align=right | 1.8 km || 
|-id=440 bgcolor=#fefefe
| 188440 ||  || — || March 17, 2004 || Kitt Peak || Spacewatch || FLO || align=right data-sort-value="0.85" | 850 m || 
|-id=441 bgcolor=#fefefe
| 188441 ||  || — || April 10, 2004 || Palomar || NEAT || CIM || align=right | 3.1 km || 
|-id=442 bgcolor=#E9E9E9
| 188442 ||  || — || April 11, 2004 || Catalina || CSS || — || align=right | 2.8 km || 
|-id=443 bgcolor=#fefefe
| 188443 ||  || — || April 12, 2004 || Palomar || NEAT || — || align=right | 1.4 km || 
|-id=444 bgcolor=#E9E9E9
| 188444 ||  || — || April 12, 2004 || Kitt Peak || Spacewatch || — || align=right | 3.4 km || 
|-id=445 bgcolor=#fefefe
| 188445 ||  || — || April 16, 2004 || Palomar || NEAT || NYS || align=right | 1.0 km || 
|-id=446 bgcolor=#fefefe
| 188446 Louischevrolet ||  ||  || April 17, 2004 || Nogales || M. Ory || — || align=right | 1.3 km || 
|-id=447 bgcolor=#fefefe
| 188447 ||  || — || April 19, 2004 || Socorro || LINEAR || MAS || align=right | 1.0 km || 
|-id=448 bgcolor=#fefefe
| 188448 ||  || — || April 20, 2004 || Siding Spring || SSS || — || align=right | 1.3 km || 
|-id=449 bgcolor=#fefefe
| 188449 ||  || — || April 20, 2004 || Kitt Peak || Spacewatch || — || align=right | 1.1 km || 
|-id=450 bgcolor=#E9E9E9
| 188450 ||  || — || April 22, 2004 || Siding Spring || SSS || — || align=right | 1.9 km || 
|-id=451 bgcolor=#fefefe
| 188451 ||  || — || April 25, 2004 || Socorro || LINEAR || — || align=right | 1.5 km || 
|-id=452 bgcolor=#FFC2E0
| 188452 ||  || — || April 26, 2004 || Siding Spring || SSS || AMO +1km || align=right | 1.2 km || 
|-id=453 bgcolor=#E9E9E9
| 188453 ||  || — || April 28, 2004 || Kitt Peak || Spacewatch || — || align=right | 1.6 km || 
|-id=454 bgcolor=#E9E9E9
| 188454 ||  || — || May 12, 2004 || Nogales || M. Schwartz, P. R. Holvorcem || — || align=right | 2.4 km || 
|-id=455 bgcolor=#E9E9E9
| 188455 ||  || — || May 12, 2004 || Catalina || CSS || — || align=right | 2.0 km || 
|-id=456 bgcolor=#E9E9E9
| 188456 ||  || — || May 12, 2004 || Socorro || LINEAR || BRU || align=right | 4.5 km || 
|-id=457 bgcolor=#E9E9E9
| 188457 ||  || — || May 10, 2004 || Palomar || NEAT || — || align=right | 3.1 km || 
|-id=458 bgcolor=#E9E9E9
| 188458 ||  || — || May 11, 2004 || Anderson Mesa || LONEOS || — || align=right | 1.0 km || 
|-id=459 bgcolor=#E9E9E9
| 188459 ||  || — || May 10, 2004 || Palomar || NEAT || MIT || align=right | 3.3 km || 
|-id=460 bgcolor=#E9E9E9
| 188460 ||  || — || May 15, 2004 || Socorro || LINEAR || — || align=right | 1.7 km || 
|-id=461 bgcolor=#fefefe
| 188461 ||  || — || May 15, 2004 || Socorro || LINEAR || NYS || align=right data-sort-value="0.97" | 970 m || 
|-id=462 bgcolor=#E9E9E9
| 188462 ||  || — || May 15, 2004 || Socorro || LINEAR || — || align=right | 1.3 km || 
|-id=463 bgcolor=#E9E9E9
| 188463 ||  || — || May 15, 2004 || Socorro || LINEAR || — || align=right | 1.6 km || 
|-id=464 bgcolor=#E9E9E9
| 188464 ||  || — || May 15, 2004 || Bergisch Gladbach || W. Bickel || — || align=right | 2.2 km || 
|-id=465 bgcolor=#E9E9E9
| 188465 ||  || — || May 18, 2004 || Socorro || LINEAR || — || align=right | 3.6 km || 
|-id=466 bgcolor=#E9E9E9
| 188466 ||  || — || May 19, 2004 || Campo Imperatore || CINEOS || KON || align=right | 3.5 km || 
|-id=467 bgcolor=#E9E9E9
| 188467 ||  || — || June 11, 2004 || Socorro || LINEAR || — || align=right | 2.2 km || 
|-id=468 bgcolor=#E9E9E9
| 188468 ||  || — || June 12, 2004 || Campo Imperatore || CINEOS || — || align=right | 1.9 km || 
|-id=469 bgcolor=#E9E9E9
| 188469 ||  || — || June 12, 2004 || Socorro || LINEAR || RAF || align=right | 1.6 km || 
|-id=470 bgcolor=#E9E9E9
| 188470 ||  || — || June 11, 2004 || Socorro || LINEAR || — || align=right | 1.6 km || 
|-id=471 bgcolor=#E9E9E9
| 188471 ||  || — || June 11, 2004 || Socorro || LINEAR || — || align=right | 1.9 km || 
|-id=472 bgcolor=#E9E9E9
| 188472 ||  || — || June 14, 2004 || Kitt Peak || Spacewatch || — || align=right | 4.1 km || 
|-id=473 bgcolor=#E9E9E9
| 188473 ||  || — || June 12, 2004 || Socorro || LINEAR || — || align=right | 4.0 km || 
|-id=474 bgcolor=#E9E9E9
| 188474 ||  || — || July 9, 2004 || Palomar || NEAT || — || align=right | 2.8 km || 
|-id=475 bgcolor=#E9E9E9
| 188475 ||  || — || July 9, 2004 || Palomar || NEAT || — || align=right | 2.6 km || 
|-id=476 bgcolor=#E9E9E9
| 188476 ||  || — || July 9, 2004 || Palomar || NEAT || KON || align=right | 4.0 km || 
|-id=477 bgcolor=#E9E9E9
| 188477 ||  || — || July 11, 2004 || Socorro || LINEAR || AGN || align=right | 2.0 km || 
|-id=478 bgcolor=#E9E9E9
| 188478 ||  || — || July 11, 2004 || Socorro || LINEAR || — || align=right | 2.9 km || 
|-id=479 bgcolor=#E9E9E9
| 188479 ||  || — || July 15, 2004 || Socorro || LINEAR || EUN || align=right | 1.7 km || 
|-id=480 bgcolor=#E9E9E9
| 188480 ||  || — || July 14, 2004 || Socorro || LINEAR || — || align=right | 3.8 km || 
|-id=481 bgcolor=#E9E9E9
| 188481 ||  || — || July 16, 2004 || Socorro || LINEAR || — || align=right | 2.8 km || 
|-id=482 bgcolor=#E9E9E9
| 188482 ||  || — || July 19, 2004 || Anderson Mesa || LONEOS || — || align=right | 3.5 km || 
|-id=483 bgcolor=#E9E9E9
| 188483 ||  || — || August 5, 2004 || Palomar || NEAT || — || align=right | 2.7 km || 
|-id=484 bgcolor=#E9E9E9
| 188484 ||  || — || August 6, 2004 || Palomar || NEAT || — || align=right | 1.3 km || 
|-id=485 bgcolor=#E9E9E9
| 188485 ||  || — || August 6, 2004 || Campo Imperatore || CINEOS || AGN || align=right | 2.0 km || 
|-id=486 bgcolor=#E9E9E9
| 188486 ||  || — || August 7, 2004 || Palomar || NEAT || — || align=right | 2.7 km || 
|-id=487 bgcolor=#E9E9E9
| 188487 ||  || — || August 8, 2004 || Socorro || LINEAR || MRX || align=right | 1.4 km || 
|-id=488 bgcolor=#E9E9E9
| 188488 ||  || — || August 8, 2004 || Socorro || LINEAR || AGN || align=right | 1.8 km || 
|-id=489 bgcolor=#d6d6d6
| 188489 ||  || — || August 8, 2004 || Campo Imperatore || CINEOS || HYG || align=right | 3.4 km || 
|-id=490 bgcolor=#E9E9E9
| 188490 ||  || — || August 8, 2004 || Anderson Mesa || LONEOS || — || align=right | 2.7 km || 
|-id=491 bgcolor=#E9E9E9
| 188491 ||  || — || August 8, 2004 || Anderson Mesa || LONEOS || GEF || align=right | 1.7 km || 
|-id=492 bgcolor=#E9E9E9
| 188492 ||  || — || August 8, 2004 || Anderson Mesa || LONEOS || — || align=right | 4.2 km || 
|-id=493 bgcolor=#E9E9E9
| 188493 ||  || — || August 8, 2004 || Socorro || LINEAR || HOF || align=right | 4.1 km || 
|-id=494 bgcolor=#E9E9E9
| 188494 ||  || — || August 8, 2004 || Socorro || LINEAR || — || align=right | 1.4 km || 
|-id=495 bgcolor=#E9E9E9
| 188495 ||  || — || August 10, 2004 || Campo Imperatore || CINEOS || — || align=right | 1.8 km || 
|-id=496 bgcolor=#d6d6d6
| 188496 ||  || — || August 8, 2004 || Anderson Mesa || LONEOS || THM || align=right | 3.0 km || 
|-id=497 bgcolor=#E9E9E9
| 188497 ||  || — || August 8, 2004 || Anderson Mesa || LONEOS || JUN || align=right | 2.1 km || 
|-id=498 bgcolor=#d6d6d6
| 188498 ||  || — || August 10, 2004 || Socorro || LINEAR || BRA || align=right | 2.2 km || 
|-id=499 bgcolor=#d6d6d6
| 188499 ||  || — || August 10, 2004 || Socorro || LINEAR || — || align=right | 5.4 km || 
|-id=500 bgcolor=#d6d6d6
| 188500 ||  || — || August 14, 2004 || Reedy Creek || J. Broughton || — || align=right | 5.1 km || 
|}

188501–188600 

|-bgcolor=#E9E9E9
| 188501 ||  || — || August 11, 2004 || Socorro || LINEAR || ADE || align=right | 4.9 km || 
|-id=502 bgcolor=#d6d6d6
| 188502 Darrellstrobel ||  ||  || August 12, 2004 || Cerro Tololo || M. W. Buie || THM || align=right | 2.6 km || 
|-id=503 bgcolor=#d6d6d6
| 188503 ||  || — || August 21, 2004 || Catalina || CSS || KOR || align=right | 2.4 km || 
|-id=504 bgcolor=#d6d6d6
| 188504 ||  || — || August 22, 2004 || Goodricke-Pigott || Goodricke-Pigott Obs. || — || align=right | 5.7 km || 
|-id=505 bgcolor=#d6d6d6
| 188505 ||  || — || August 19, 2004 || Siding Spring || SSS || — || align=right | 3.8 km || 
|-id=506 bgcolor=#d6d6d6
| 188506 ||  || — || September 5, 2004 || Vicques || M. Ory || — || align=right | 4.7 km || 
|-id=507 bgcolor=#E9E9E9
| 188507 ||  || — || September 4, 2004 || Palomar || NEAT || — || align=right | 3.5 km || 
|-id=508 bgcolor=#d6d6d6
| 188508 ||  || — || September 7, 2004 || Kitt Peak || Spacewatch || — || align=right | 4.1 km || 
|-id=509 bgcolor=#d6d6d6
| 188509 ||  || — || September 7, 2004 || Socorro || LINEAR || — || align=right | 5.5 km || 
|-id=510 bgcolor=#E9E9E9
| 188510 ||  || — || September 7, 2004 || Socorro || LINEAR || DOR || align=right | 4.5 km || 
|-id=511 bgcolor=#d6d6d6
| 188511 ||  || — || September 7, 2004 || Kitt Peak || Spacewatch || THM || align=right | 2.9 km || 
|-id=512 bgcolor=#d6d6d6
| 188512 ||  || — || September 8, 2004 || Socorro || LINEAR || EOS || align=right | 3.0 km || 
|-id=513 bgcolor=#d6d6d6
| 188513 ||  || — || September 8, 2004 || Socorro || LINEAR || HYG || align=right | 4.4 km || 
|-id=514 bgcolor=#d6d6d6
| 188514 ||  || — || September 8, 2004 || Socorro || LINEAR || EOS || align=right | 3.1 km || 
|-id=515 bgcolor=#E9E9E9
| 188515 ||  || — || September 8, 2004 || Socorro || LINEAR || — || align=right | 3.6 km || 
|-id=516 bgcolor=#d6d6d6
| 188516 ||  || — || September 8, 2004 || Socorro || LINEAR || EOS || align=right | 3.4 km || 
|-id=517 bgcolor=#d6d6d6
| 188517 ||  || — || September 8, 2004 || Socorro || LINEAR || TIR || align=right | 3.1 km || 
|-id=518 bgcolor=#d6d6d6
| 188518 ||  || — || September 8, 2004 || Socorro || LINEAR || — || align=right | 3.8 km || 
|-id=519 bgcolor=#d6d6d6
| 188519 ||  || — || September 8, 2004 || Socorro || LINEAR || EOS || align=right | 3.1 km || 
|-id=520 bgcolor=#d6d6d6
| 188520 ||  || — || September 8, 2004 || Socorro || LINEAR || — || align=right | 3.4 km || 
|-id=521 bgcolor=#d6d6d6
| 188521 ||  || — || September 8, 2004 || Socorro || LINEAR || — || align=right | 4.8 km || 
|-id=522 bgcolor=#d6d6d6
| 188522 ||  || — || September 8, 2004 || Socorro || LINEAR || — || align=right | 4.8 km || 
|-id=523 bgcolor=#d6d6d6
| 188523 ||  || — || September 8, 2004 || Socorro || LINEAR || URS || align=right | 6.2 km || 
|-id=524 bgcolor=#d6d6d6
| 188524 ||  || — || September 8, 2004 || Socorro || LINEAR || — || align=right | 5.1 km || 
|-id=525 bgcolor=#E9E9E9
| 188525 ||  || — || September 8, 2004 || Palomar || NEAT || — || align=right | 3.0 km || 
|-id=526 bgcolor=#d6d6d6
| 188526 ||  || — || September 7, 2004 || Palomar || NEAT || — || align=right | 5.7 km || 
|-id=527 bgcolor=#E9E9E9
| 188527 ||  || — || September 7, 2004 || Socorro || LINEAR || — || align=right | 2.9 km || 
|-id=528 bgcolor=#d6d6d6
| 188528 ||  || — || September 9, 2004 || Socorro || LINEAR || — || align=right | 3.6 km || 
|-id=529 bgcolor=#d6d6d6
| 188529 ||  || — || September 10, 2004 || Socorro || LINEAR || EOS || align=right | 3.0 km || 
|-id=530 bgcolor=#E9E9E9
| 188530 ||  || — || September 10, 2004 || Socorro || LINEAR || — || align=right | 3.6 km || 
|-id=531 bgcolor=#E9E9E9
| 188531 ||  || — || September 10, 2004 || Socorro || LINEAR || — || align=right | 4.6 km || 
|-id=532 bgcolor=#E9E9E9
| 188532 ||  || — || September 10, 2004 || Socorro || LINEAR || — || align=right | 4.7 km || 
|-id=533 bgcolor=#d6d6d6
| 188533 ||  || — || September 10, 2004 || Kitt Peak || Spacewatch || THM || align=right | 3.0 km || 
|-id=534 bgcolor=#E9E9E9
| 188534 Mauna Kea ||  ||  || September 15, 2004 || Mauna Kea || J. Pittichová, J. Bedient || — || align=right | 2.8 km || 
|-id=535 bgcolor=#d6d6d6
| 188535 ||  || — || September 6, 2004 || Palomar || NEAT || — || align=right | 4.9 km || 
|-id=536 bgcolor=#d6d6d6
| 188536 ||  || — || September 10, 2004 || Socorro || LINEAR || ALA || align=right | 6.3 km || 
|-id=537 bgcolor=#d6d6d6
| 188537 ||  || — || September 10, 2004 || Socorro || LINEAR || EOS || align=right | 3.4 km || 
|-id=538 bgcolor=#d6d6d6
| 188538 ||  || — || September 13, 2004 || Socorro || LINEAR || — || align=right | 5.3 km || 
|-id=539 bgcolor=#d6d6d6
| 188539 ||  || — || September 15, 2004 || Siding Spring || SSS || — || align=right | 4.7 km || 
|-id=540 bgcolor=#d6d6d6
| 188540 ||  || — || September 13, 2004 || Socorro || LINEAR || — || align=right | 6.2 km || 
|-id=541 bgcolor=#d6d6d6
| 188541 ||  || — || September 15, 2004 || Kitt Peak || Spacewatch || THM || align=right | 3.8 km || 
|-id=542 bgcolor=#E9E9E9
| 188542 ||  || — || September 15, 2004 || Anderson Mesa || LONEOS || — || align=right | 4.2 km || 
|-id=543 bgcolor=#d6d6d6
| 188543 ||  || — || September 7, 2004 || Socorro || LINEAR || EUP || align=right | 6.5 km || 
|-id=544 bgcolor=#E9E9E9
| 188544 ||  || — || September 17, 2004 || Socorro || LINEAR || HNA || align=right | 4.2 km || 
|-id=545 bgcolor=#d6d6d6
| 188545 ||  || — || September 17, 2004 || Anderson Mesa || LONEOS || — || align=right | 4.7 km || 
|-id=546 bgcolor=#d6d6d6
| 188546 ||  || — || September 17, 2004 || Socorro || LINEAR || 7:4 || align=right | 7.4 km || 
|-id=547 bgcolor=#d6d6d6
| 188547 ||  || — || September 17, 2004 || Kitt Peak || Spacewatch || — || align=right | 4.0 km || 
|-id=548 bgcolor=#d6d6d6
| 188548 ||  || — || September 17, 2004 || Socorro || LINEAR || — || align=right | 5.0 km || 
|-id=549 bgcolor=#d6d6d6
| 188549 ||  || — || September 17, 2004 || Anderson Mesa || LONEOS || 7:4 || align=right | 6.7 km || 
|-id=550 bgcolor=#d6d6d6
| 188550 ||  || — || October 4, 2004 || Kitt Peak || Spacewatch || — || align=right | 3.5 km || 
|-id=551 bgcolor=#d6d6d6
| 188551 ||  || — || October 4, 2004 || Kitt Peak || Spacewatch || VER || align=right | 5.0 km || 
|-id=552 bgcolor=#d6d6d6
| 188552 ||  || — || October 9, 2004 || Goodricke-Pigott || Goodricke-Pigott Obs. || — || align=right | 5.2 km || 
|-id=553 bgcolor=#d6d6d6
| 188553 ||  || — || October 10, 2004 || Socorro || LINEAR || — || align=right | 6.8 km || 
|-id=554 bgcolor=#d6d6d6
| 188554 ||  || — || October 4, 2004 || Kitt Peak || Spacewatch || THM || align=right | 2.6 km || 
|-id=555 bgcolor=#d6d6d6
| 188555 ||  || — || October 5, 2004 || Anderson Mesa || LONEOS || — || align=right | 6.0 km || 
|-id=556 bgcolor=#d6d6d6
| 188556 ||  || — || October 5, 2004 || Anderson Mesa || LONEOS || — || align=right | 4.8 km || 
|-id=557 bgcolor=#d6d6d6
| 188557 ||  || — || October 5, 2004 || Anderson Mesa || LONEOS || HYG || align=right | 3.2 km || 
|-id=558 bgcolor=#d6d6d6
| 188558 ||  || — || October 5, 2004 || Anderson Mesa || LONEOS || ALA || align=right | 6.4 km || 
|-id=559 bgcolor=#E9E9E9
| 188559 ||  || — || October 5, 2004 || Anderson Mesa || LONEOS || HOF || align=right | 5.2 km || 
|-id=560 bgcolor=#d6d6d6
| 188560 ||  || — || October 6, 2004 || Kitt Peak || Spacewatch || — || align=right | 3.5 km || 
|-id=561 bgcolor=#d6d6d6
| 188561 ||  || — || October 4, 2004 || Socorro || LINEAR || — || align=right | 6.8 km || 
|-id=562 bgcolor=#d6d6d6
| 188562 ||  || — || October 5, 2004 || Anderson Mesa || LONEOS || HYG || align=right | 4.6 km || 
|-id=563 bgcolor=#d6d6d6
| 188563 ||  || — || October 6, 2004 || Anderson Mesa || LONEOS || EOS || align=right | 6.0 km || 
|-id=564 bgcolor=#d6d6d6
| 188564 ||  || — || October 6, 2004 || Palomar || NEAT || — || align=right | 5.6 km || 
|-id=565 bgcolor=#d6d6d6
| 188565 ||  || — || October 7, 2004 || Anderson Mesa || LONEOS || — || align=right | 5.6 km || 
|-id=566 bgcolor=#d6d6d6
| 188566 ||  || — || October 7, 2004 || Socorro || LINEAR || — || align=right | 3.7 km || 
|-id=567 bgcolor=#d6d6d6
| 188567 ||  || — || October 7, 2004 || Socorro || LINEAR || — || align=right | 6.1 km || 
|-id=568 bgcolor=#d6d6d6
| 188568 ||  || — || October 7, 2004 || Socorro || LINEAR || — || align=right | 6.7 km || 
|-id=569 bgcolor=#d6d6d6
| 188569 ||  || — || October 8, 2004 || Anderson Mesa || LONEOS || — || align=right | 4.0 km || 
|-id=570 bgcolor=#d6d6d6
| 188570 ||  || — || October 13, 2004 || Kitt Peak || Spacewatch || — || align=right | 6.1 km || 
|-id=571 bgcolor=#d6d6d6
| 188571 ||  || — || October 21, 2004 || Socorro || LINEAR || — || align=right | 6.4 km || 
|-id=572 bgcolor=#d6d6d6
| 188572 ||  || — || November 7, 2004 || Socorro || LINEAR || — || align=right | 4.1 km || 
|-id=573 bgcolor=#d6d6d6
| 188573 ||  || — || December 13, 2004 || Catalina || CSS || HYG || align=right | 5.0 km || 
|-id=574 bgcolor=#C2FFFF
| 188574 ||  || — || December 18, 2004 || Mount Lemmon || Mount Lemmon Survey || L5 || align=right | 9.9 km || 
|-id=575 bgcolor=#fefefe
| 188575 ||  || — || February 1, 2005 || Catalina || CSS || H || align=right | 1.1 km || 
|-id=576 bgcolor=#fefefe
| 188576 Kosenda ||  ||  || March 5, 2005 || Kitami || K. Endate || H || align=right | 1.2 km || 
|-id=577 bgcolor=#fefefe
| 188577 ||  || — || April 2, 2005 || Catalina || CSS || H || align=right data-sort-value="0.92" | 920 m || 
|-id=578 bgcolor=#fefefe
| 188578 ||  || — || April 1, 2005 || Anderson Mesa || LONEOS || FLO || align=right data-sort-value="0.85" | 850 m || 
|-id=579 bgcolor=#E9E9E9
| 188579 ||  || — || April 4, 2005 || Mount Lemmon || Mount Lemmon Survey || — || align=right | 1.6 km || 
|-id=580 bgcolor=#fefefe
| 188580 ||  || — || April 5, 2005 || Palomar || NEAT || H || align=right | 1.0 km || 
|-id=581 bgcolor=#fefefe
| 188581 ||  || — || May 10, 2005 || Kitt Peak || Spacewatch || — || align=right | 1.2 km || 
|-id=582 bgcolor=#fefefe
| 188582 ||  || — || June 10, 2005 || Kitt Peak || Spacewatch || — || align=right | 1.0 km || 
|-id=583 bgcolor=#fefefe
| 188583 ||  || — || June 21, 2005 || Palomar || NEAT || — || align=right data-sort-value="0.87" | 870 m || 
|-id=584 bgcolor=#fefefe
| 188584 ||  || — || June 30, 2005 || Kitt Peak || Spacewatch || — || align=right data-sort-value="0.98" | 980 m || 
|-id=585 bgcolor=#fefefe
| 188585 ||  || — || June 30, 2005 || Palomar || NEAT || FLO || align=right data-sort-value="0.92" | 920 m || 
|-id=586 bgcolor=#fefefe
| 188586 ||  || — || July 2, 2005 || Kitt Peak || Spacewatch || — || align=right data-sort-value="0.87" | 870 m || 
|-id=587 bgcolor=#fefefe
| 188587 ||  || — || July 1, 2005 || Kitt Peak || Spacewatch || — || align=right | 1.3 km || 
|-id=588 bgcolor=#fefefe
| 188588 ||  || — || July 8, 2005 || Wrightwood || J. W. Young || — || align=right | 1.0 km || 
|-id=589 bgcolor=#fefefe
| 188589 ||  || — || July 6, 2005 || Reedy Creek || J. Broughton || — || align=right | 1.0 km || 
|-id=590 bgcolor=#fefefe
| 188590 ||  || — || July 6, 2005 || Kitt Peak || Spacewatch || V || align=right data-sort-value="0.85" | 850 m || 
|-id=591 bgcolor=#fefefe
| 188591 ||  || — || July 9, 2005 || Kitt Peak || Spacewatch || — || align=right | 1.1 km || 
|-id=592 bgcolor=#fefefe
| 188592 ||  || — || July 8, 2005 || Kitt Peak || Spacewatch || — || align=right | 1.6 km || 
|-id=593 bgcolor=#fefefe
| 188593 ||  || — || July 28, 2005 || Palomar || NEAT || — || align=right | 1.5 km || 
|-id=594 bgcolor=#fefefe
| 188594 ||  || — || July 28, 2005 || Palomar || NEAT || — || align=right | 1.5 km || 
|-id=595 bgcolor=#fefefe
| 188595 ||  || — || July 29, 2005 || Palomar || NEAT || — || align=right | 1.3 km || 
|-id=596 bgcolor=#fefefe
| 188596 ||  || — || July 27, 2005 || Palomar || NEAT || — || align=right data-sort-value="0.92" | 920 m || 
|-id=597 bgcolor=#fefefe
| 188597 ||  || — || July 28, 2005 || Palomar || NEAT || — || align=right | 1.1 km || 
|-id=598 bgcolor=#fefefe
| 188598 ||  || — || July 29, 2005 || Reedy Creek || J. Broughton || ERI || align=right | 2.5 km || 
|-id=599 bgcolor=#fefefe
| 188599 ||  || — || July 29, 2005 || Palomar || NEAT || — || align=right | 1.5 km || 
|-id=600 bgcolor=#fefefe
| 188600 ||  || — || August 2, 2005 || Socorro || LINEAR || NYS || align=right | 1.2 km || 
|}

188601–188700 

|-bgcolor=#fefefe
| 188601 ||  || — || August 4, 2005 || Palomar || NEAT || NYS || align=right | 1.1 km || 
|-id=602 bgcolor=#fefefe
| 188602 ||  || — || August 4, 2005 || Palomar || NEAT || V || align=right data-sort-value="0.93" | 930 m || 
|-id=603 bgcolor=#fefefe
| 188603 ||  || — || August 4, 2005 || Palomar || NEAT || — || align=right | 1.4 km || 
|-id=604 bgcolor=#E9E9E9
| 188604 ||  || — || August 4, 2005 || Palomar || NEAT || — || align=right | 1.4 km || 
|-id=605 bgcolor=#fefefe
| 188605 ||  || — || August 5, 2005 || Palomar || NEAT || FLO || align=right data-sort-value="0.93" | 930 m || 
|-id=606 bgcolor=#fefefe
| 188606 ||  || — || August 10, 2005 || Reedy Creek || J. Broughton || FLO || align=right data-sort-value="0.85" | 850 m || 
|-id=607 bgcolor=#fefefe
| 188607 ||  || — || August 15, 2005 || Siding Spring || SSS || — || align=right | 1.2 km || 
|-id=608 bgcolor=#fefefe
| 188608 ||  || — || August 24, 2005 || Palomar || NEAT || V || align=right data-sort-value="0.90" | 900 m || 
|-id=609 bgcolor=#fefefe
| 188609 ||  || — || August 24, 2005 || Palomar || NEAT || — || align=right | 1.5 km || 
|-id=610 bgcolor=#fefefe
| 188610 ||  || — || August 24, 2005 || Palomar || NEAT || — || align=right | 1.3 km || 
|-id=611 bgcolor=#fefefe
| 188611 ||  || — || August 24, 2005 || Haleakala || NEAT || FLO || align=right | 1.2 km || 
|-id=612 bgcolor=#E9E9E9
| 188612 ||  || — || August 25, 2005 || Palomar || NEAT || MRX || align=right | 1.5 km || 
|-id=613 bgcolor=#E9E9E9
| 188613 ||  || — || August 24, 2005 || Palomar || NEAT || MRX || align=right | 1.4 km || 
|-id=614 bgcolor=#fefefe
| 188614 ||  || — || August 25, 2005 || Palomar || NEAT || NYS || align=right data-sort-value="0.88" | 880 m || 
|-id=615 bgcolor=#fefefe
| 188615 ||  || — || August 25, 2005 || Palomar || NEAT || FLO || align=right | 1.1 km || 
|-id=616 bgcolor=#fefefe
| 188616 ||  || — || August 25, 2005 || Palomar || NEAT || — || align=right data-sort-value="0.93" | 930 m || 
|-id=617 bgcolor=#E9E9E9
| 188617 ||  || — || August 27, 2005 || Kitt Peak || Spacewatch || MAR || align=right | 1.3 km || 
|-id=618 bgcolor=#E9E9E9
| 188618 ||  || — || August 27, 2005 || Kitt Peak || Spacewatch || — || align=right | 2.9 km || 
|-id=619 bgcolor=#fefefe
| 188619 ||  || — || August 26, 2005 || Palomar || NEAT || V || align=right data-sort-value="0.70" | 700 m || 
|-id=620 bgcolor=#d6d6d6
| 188620 ||  || — || August 26, 2005 || Anderson Mesa || LONEOS || — || align=right | 3.4 km || 
|-id=621 bgcolor=#fefefe
| 188621 ||  || — || August 25, 2005 || Palomar || NEAT || NYS || align=right | 1.0 km || 
|-id=622 bgcolor=#fefefe
| 188622 ||  || — || August 25, 2005 || Palomar || NEAT || — || align=right data-sort-value="0.94" | 940 m || 
|-id=623 bgcolor=#fefefe
| 188623 ||  || — || August 25, 2005 || Palomar || NEAT || V || align=right data-sort-value="0.80" | 800 m || 
|-id=624 bgcolor=#fefefe
| 188624 ||  || — || August 26, 2005 || Anderson Mesa || LONEOS || — || align=right | 1.3 km || 
|-id=625 bgcolor=#fefefe
| 188625 ||  || — || August 26, 2005 || Anderson Mesa || LONEOS || — || align=right data-sort-value="0.98" | 980 m || 
|-id=626 bgcolor=#E9E9E9
| 188626 ||  || — || August 26, 2005 || Palomar || NEAT || — || align=right | 1.4 km || 
|-id=627 bgcolor=#fefefe
| 188627 ||  || — || August 26, 2005 || Palomar || NEAT || FLO || align=right | 1.1 km || 
|-id=628 bgcolor=#fefefe
| 188628 ||  || — || August 28, 2005 || Kitt Peak || Spacewatch || — || align=right | 1.9 km || 
|-id=629 bgcolor=#E9E9E9
| 188629 ||  || — || August 28, 2005 || Kitt Peak || Spacewatch || — || align=right | 3.9 km || 
|-id=630 bgcolor=#fefefe
| 188630 ||  || — || August 28, 2005 || Siding Spring || SSS || — || align=right | 1.3 km || 
|-id=631 bgcolor=#fefefe
| 188631 ||  || — || August 29, 2005 || Socorro || LINEAR || V || align=right data-sort-value="0.90" | 900 m || 
|-id=632 bgcolor=#fefefe
| 188632 ||  || — || August 24, 2005 || Palomar || NEAT || — || align=right | 1.7 km || 
|-id=633 bgcolor=#fefefe
| 188633 ||  || — || August 28, 2005 || Anderson Mesa || LONEOS || FLO || align=right | 1.0 km || 
|-id=634 bgcolor=#fefefe
| 188634 ||  || — || August 28, 2005 || Haleakala || NEAT || — || align=right | 1.5 km || 
|-id=635 bgcolor=#fefefe
| 188635 ||  || — || August 29, 2005 || Socorro || LINEAR || — || align=right | 1.0 km || 
|-id=636 bgcolor=#fefefe
| 188636 ||  || — || August 29, 2005 || Socorro || LINEAR || V || align=right | 1.1 km || 
|-id=637 bgcolor=#fefefe
| 188637 ||  || — || August 26, 2005 || Anderson Mesa || LONEOS || NYS || align=right | 2.4 km || 
|-id=638 bgcolor=#E9E9E9
| 188638 ||  || — || August 27, 2005 || Palomar || NEAT || — || align=right | 2.8 km || 
|-id=639 bgcolor=#E9E9E9
| 188639 ||  || — || August 27, 2005 || Palomar || NEAT || — || align=right | 2.1 km || 
|-id=640 bgcolor=#fefefe
| 188640 ||  || — || August 28, 2005 || Kitt Peak || Spacewatch || — || align=right | 1.1 km || 
|-id=641 bgcolor=#fefefe
| 188641 ||  || — || August 28, 2005 || Siding Spring || SSS || — || align=right | 1.5 km || 
|-id=642 bgcolor=#E9E9E9
| 188642 ||  || — || August 26, 2005 || Palomar || NEAT || — || align=right | 2.9 km || 
|-id=643 bgcolor=#E9E9E9
| 188643 ||  || — || September 1, 2005 || Kitt Peak || Spacewatch || — || align=right | 2.4 km || 
|-id=644 bgcolor=#fefefe
| 188644 ||  || — || September 8, 2005 || Socorro || LINEAR || — || align=right | 1.2 km || 
|-id=645 bgcolor=#fefefe
| 188645 ||  || — || September 14, 2005 || Catalina || CSS || — || align=right | 1.7 km || 
|-id=646 bgcolor=#fefefe
| 188646 ||  || — || September 14, 2005 || Kitt Peak || Spacewatch || — || align=right | 1.1 km || 
|-id=647 bgcolor=#E9E9E9
| 188647 ||  || — || September 24, 2005 || Kitt Peak || Spacewatch || AGN || align=right | 1.8 km || 
|-id=648 bgcolor=#E9E9E9
| 188648 ||  || — || September 24, 2005 || Kitt Peak || Spacewatch || — || align=right | 1.5 km || 
|-id=649 bgcolor=#fefefe
| 188649 ||  || — || September 23, 2005 || Kitt Peak || Spacewatch || — || align=right | 1.3 km || 
|-id=650 bgcolor=#E9E9E9
| 188650 ||  || — || September 23, 2005 || Kitt Peak || Spacewatch || — || align=right | 2.2 km || 
|-id=651 bgcolor=#E9E9E9
| 188651 ||  || — || September 24, 2005 || Kitt Peak || Spacewatch || — || align=right | 3.5 km || 
|-id=652 bgcolor=#E9E9E9
| 188652 ||  || — || September 24, 2005 || Kitt Peak || Spacewatch || — || align=right | 1.3 km || 
|-id=653 bgcolor=#E9E9E9
| 188653 ||  || — || September 26, 2005 || Kitt Peak || Spacewatch || — || align=right | 1.7 km || 
|-id=654 bgcolor=#d6d6d6
| 188654 ||  || — || September 26, 2005 || Kitt Peak || Spacewatch || — || align=right | 3.7 km || 
|-id=655 bgcolor=#d6d6d6
| 188655 ||  || — || September 26, 2005 || Kitt Peak || Spacewatch || — || align=right | 2.5 km || 
|-id=656 bgcolor=#E9E9E9
| 188656 ||  || — || September 27, 2005 || Kitt Peak || Spacewatch || — || align=right | 1.9 km || 
|-id=657 bgcolor=#fefefe
| 188657 ||  || — || September 23, 2005 || Catalina || CSS || — || align=right | 1.0 km || 
|-id=658 bgcolor=#E9E9E9
| 188658 ||  || — || September 24, 2005 || Kitt Peak || Spacewatch || — || align=right | 1.0 km || 
|-id=659 bgcolor=#E9E9E9
| 188659 ||  || — || September 24, 2005 || Kitt Peak || Spacewatch || — || align=right | 2.1 km || 
|-id=660 bgcolor=#fefefe
| 188660 ||  || — || September 24, 2005 || Kitt Peak || Spacewatch || NYS || align=right data-sort-value="0.85" | 850 m || 
|-id=661 bgcolor=#E9E9E9
| 188661 ||  || — || September 25, 2005 || Palomar || NEAT || — || align=right | 2.1 km || 
|-id=662 bgcolor=#E9E9E9
| 188662 ||  || — || September 25, 2005 || Palomar || NEAT || — || align=right | 3.2 km || 
|-id=663 bgcolor=#E9E9E9
| 188663 ||  || — || September 25, 2005 || Palomar || NEAT || — || align=right | 1.6 km || 
|-id=664 bgcolor=#fefefe
| 188664 ||  || — || September 26, 2005 || Kitt Peak || Spacewatch || MAS || align=right data-sort-value="0.90" | 900 m || 
|-id=665 bgcolor=#fefefe
| 188665 ||  || — || September 28, 2005 || Palomar || NEAT || — || align=right | 1.2 km || 
|-id=666 bgcolor=#d6d6d6
| 188666 ||  || — || September 29, 2005 || Mount Lemmon || Mount Lemmon Survey || EOS || align=right | 2.2 km || 
|-id=667 bgcolor=#d6d6d6
| 188667 ||  || — || September 29, 2005 || Kitt Peak || Spacewatch || — || align=right | 5.3 km || 
|-id=668 bgcolor=#d6d6d6
| 188668 ||  || — || September 29, 2005 || Mount Lemmon || Mount Lemmon Survey || — || align=right | 4.6 km || 
|-id=669 bgcolor=#fefefe
| 188669 ||  || — || September 25, 2005 || Kitt Peak || Spacewatch || MAS || align=right data-sort-value="0.85" | 850 m || 
|-id=670 bgcolor=#E9E9E9
| 188670 ||  || — || September 25, 2005 || Kitt Peak || Spacewatch || — || align=right | 1.1 km || 
|-id=671 bgcolor=#d6d6d6
| 188671 ||  || — || September 25, 2005 || Kitt Peak || Spacewatch || THM || align=right | 2.4 km || 
|-id=672 bgcolor=#d6d6d6
| 188672 ||  || — || September 25, 2005 || Kitt Peak || Spacewatch || KOR || align=right | 1.8 km || 
|-id=673 bgcolor=#E9E9E9
| 188673 ||  || — || September 27, 2005 || Palomar || NEAT || — || align=right | 4.2 km || 
|-id=674 bgcolor=#fefefe
| 188674 ||  || — || September 29, 2005 || Palomar || NEAT || MAS || align=right | 1.1 km || 
|-id=675 bgcolor=#E9E9E9
| 188675 ||  || — || September 30, 2005 || Palomar || NEAT || HNS || align=right | 1.8 km || 
|-id=676 bgcolor=#fefefe
| 188676 ||  || — || September 30, 2005 || Anderson Mesa || LONEOS || — || align=right | 1.2 km || 
|-id=677 bgcolor=#fefefe
| 188677 ||  || — || September 30, 2005 || Palomar || NEAT || NYS || align=right data-sort-value="0.82" | 820 m || 
|-id=678 bgcolor=#E9E9E9
| 188678 ||  || — || September 30, 2005 || Mount Lemmon || Mount Lemmon Survey || AGN || align=right | 1.5 km || 
|-id=679 bgcolor=#E9E9E9
| 188679 ||  || — || September 30, 2005 || Mount Lemmon || Mount Lemmon Survey || GEF || align=right | 2.3 km || 
|-id=680 bgcolor=#E9E9E9
| 188680 ||  || — || September 30, 2005 || Palomar || NEAT || GEF || align=right | 2.1 km || 
|-id=681 bgcolor=#E9E9E9
| 188681 ||  || — || September 29, 2005 || Catalina || CSS || — || align=right | 2.4 km || 
|-id=682 bgcolor=#E9E9E9
| 188682 ||  || — || September 30, 2005 || Mount Lemmon || Mount Lemmon Survey || — || align=right | 2.5 km || 
|-id=683 bgcolor=#E9E9E9
| 188683 ||  || — || September 30, 2005 || Mount Lemmon || Mount Lemmon Survey || JUN || align=right | 1.8 km || 
|-id=684 bgcolor=#E9E9E9
| 188684 ||  || — || September 29, 2005 || Kitt Peak || Spacewatch || — || align=right | 2.3 km || 
|-id=685 bgcolor=#E9E9E9
| 188685 ||  || — || September 30, 2005 || Kitt Peak || Spacewatch || — || align=right | 2.5 km || 
|-id=686 bgcolor=#E9E9E9
| 188686 ||  || — || September 30, 2005 || Mount Lemmon || Mount Lemmon Survey || — || align=right | 2.8 km || 
|-id=687 bgcolor=#fefefe
| 188687 ||  || — || September 23, 2005 || Catalina || CSS || NYS || align=right data-sort-value="0.94" | 940 m || 
|-id=688 bgcolor=#E9E9E9
| 188688 ||  || — || September 27, 2005 || Kitt Peak || Spacewatch || — || align=right | 1.8 km || 
|-id=689 bgcolor=#E9E9E9
| 188689 ||  || — || September 29, 2005 || Mount Lemmon || Mount Lemmon Survey || HOF || align=right | 2.7 km || 
|-id=690 bgcolor=#fefefe
| 188690 || 2005 TK || — || October 1, 2005 || Greiner Research || M. Mills || NYS || align=right data-sort-value="0.93" | 930 m || 
|-id=691 bgcolor=#E9E9E9
| 188691 ||  || — || October 1, 2005 || Kitt Peak || Spacewatch || — || align=right | 1.2 km || 
|-id=692 bgcolor=#E9E9E9
| 188692 ||  || — || October 1, 2005 || Mount Lemmon || Mount Lemmon Survey || AGN || align=right | 1.8 km || 
|-id=693 bgcolor=#fefefe
| 188693 Roosevelt ||  ||  || October 3, 2005 || Catalina || R. A. Kowalski || V || align=right data-sort-value="0.85" | 850 m || 
|-id=694 bgcolor=#fefefe
| 188694 ||  || — || October 1, 2005 || Socorro || LINEAR || FLO || align=right data-sort-value="0.76" | 760 m || 
|-id=695 bgcolor=#E9E9E9
| 188695 ||  || — || October 1, 2005 || Socorro || LINEAR || — || align=right | 1.5 km || 
|-id=696 bgcolor=#d6d6d6
| 188696 ||  || — || October 1, 2005 || Mount Lemmon || Mount Lemmon Survey || — || align=right | 4.1 km || 
|-id=697 bgcolor=#E9E9E9
| 188697 ||  || — || October 1, 2005 || Mount Lemmon || Mount Lemmon Survey || — || align=right | 2.0 km || 
|-id=698 bgcolor=#E9E9E9
| 188698 ||  || — || October 1, 2005 || Mount Lemmon || Mount Lemmon Survey || — || align=right | 1.8 km || 
|-id=699 bgcolor=#E9E9E9
| 188699 ||  || — || October 1, 2005 || Kitt Peak || Spacewatch || — || align=right | 2.3 km || 
|-id=700 bgcolor=#E9E9E9
| 188700 ||  || — || October 1, 2005 || Kitt Peak || Spacewatch || HOF || align=right | 3.0 km || 
|}

188701–188800 

|-bgcolor=#E9E9E9
| 188701 ||  || — || October 3, 2005 || Goodricke-Pigott || R. A. Tucker || — || align=right | 2.6 km || 
|-id=702 bgcolor=#E9E9E9
| 188702 ||  || — || October 1, 2005 || Mount Lemmon || Mount Lemmon Survey || AST || align=right | 2.2 km || 
|-id=703 bgcolor=#E9E9E9
| 188703 ||  || — || October 2, 2005 || Mount Lemmon || Mount Lemmon Survey || AGN || align=right | 1.5 km || 
|-id=704 bgcolor=#E9E9E9
| 188704 ||  || — || October 6, 2005 || Catalina || CSS || HEN || align=right | 1.6 km || 
|-id=705 bgcolor=#E9E9E9
| 188705 ||  || — || October 6, 2005 || Anderson Mesa || LONEOS || — || align=right | 2.1 km || 
|-id=706 bgcolor=#E9E9E9
| 188706 ||  || — || October 6, 2005 || Mount Lemmon || Mount Lemmon Survey || — || align=right | 2.3 km || 
|-id=707 bgcolor=#d6d6d6
| 188707 ||  || — || October 6, 2005 || Kitt Peak || Spacewatch || — || align=right | 3.1 km || 
|-id=708 bgcolor=#fefefe
| 188708 ||  || — || October 7, 2005 || Socorro || LINEAR || — || align=right | 1.1 km || 
|-id=709 bgcolor=#fefefe
| 188709 ||  || — || October 7, 2005 || Catalina || CSS || ERI || align=right | 3.1 km || 
|-id=710 bgcolor=#fefefe
| 188710 ||  || — || October 7, 2005 || Catalina || CSS || FLO || align=right data-sort-value="0.98" | 980 m || 
|-id=711 bgcolor=#E9E9E9
| 188711 ||  || — || October 7, 2005 || Kitt Peak || Spacewatch || — || align=right | 1.7 km || 
|-id=712 bgcolor=#d6d6d6
| 188712 ||  || — || October 7, 2005 || Kitt Peak || Spacewatch || THM || align=right | 3.6 km || 
|-id=713 bgcolor=#E9E9E9
| 188713 ||  || — || October 8, 2005 || Kitt Peak || Spacewatch || NEM || align=right | 3.1 km || 
|-id=714 bgcolor=#d6d6d6
| 188714 ||  || — || October 9, 2005 || Kitt Peak || Spacewatch || — || align=right | 3.1 km || 
|-id=715 bgcolor=#d6d6d6
| 188715 ||  || — || October 9, 2005 || Kitt Peak || Spacewatch || — || align=right | 3.3 km || 
|-id=716 bgcolor=#E9E9E9
| 188716 ||  || — || October 9, 2005 || Kitt Peak || Spacewatch || — || align=right | 2.7 km || 
|-id=717 bgcolor=#FA8072
| 188717 ||  || — || October 10, 2005 || Catalina || CSS || — || align=right | 1.1 km || 
|-id=718 bgcolor=#d6d6d6
| 188718 ||  || — || October 1, 2005 || Mount Lemmon || Mount Lemmon Survey || — || align=right | 6.6 km || 
|-id=719 bgcolor=#E9E9E9
| 188719 ||  || — || October 7, 2005 || Anderson Mesa || LONEOS || MAR || align=right | 1.9 km || 
|-id=720 bgcolor=#d6d6d6
| 188720 ||  || — || October 1, 2005 || Mount Lemmon || Mount Lemmon Survey || — || align=right | 4.4 km || 
|-id=721 bgcolor=#d6d6d6
| 188721 || 2005 UU || — || October 23, 2005 || Wrightwood || J. W. Young || — || align=right | 3.9 km || 
|-id=722 bgcolor=#E9E9E9
| 188722 ||  || — || October 23, 2005 || Goodricke-Pigott || R. A. Tucker || — || align=right | 2.2 km || 
|-id=723 bgcolor=#E9E9E9
| 188723 ||  || — || October 22, 2005 || Kitt Peak || Spacewatch || — || align=right | 2.5 km || 
|-id=724 bgcolor=#E9E9E9
| 188724 ||  || — || October 22, 2005 || Kitt Peak || Spacewatch || — || align=right | 3.0 km || 
|-id=725 bgcolor=#E9E9E9
| 188725 ||  || — || October 24, 2005 || Kitt Peak || Spacewatch || — || align=right | 2.9 km || 
|-id=726 bgcolor=#E9E9E9
| 188726 ||  || — || October 25, 2005 || Kitt Peak || Spacewatch || — || align=right | 3.5 km || 
|-id=727 bgcolor=#d6d6d6
| 188727 ||  || — || October 22, 2005 || Kitt Peak || Spacewatch || — || align=right | 3.7 km || 
|-id=728 bgcolor=#E9E9E9
| 188728 ||  || — || October 22, 2005 || Catalina || CSS || — || align=right | 1.8 km || 
|-id=729 bgcolor=#d6d6d6
| 188729 ||  || — || October 23, 2005 || Catalina || CSS || LUT || align=right | 6.7 km || 
|-id=730 bgcolor=#E9E9E9
| 188730 ||  || — || October 23, 2005 || Catalina || CSS || — || align=right | 4.9 km || 
|-id=731 bgcolor=#E9E9E9
| 188731 ||  || — || October 23, 2005 || Catalina || CSS || — || align=right | 3.7 km || 
|-id=732 bgcolor=#E9E9E9
| 188732 ||  || — || October 25, 2005 || Mount Lemmon || Mount Lemmon Survey || AST || align=right | 2.0 km || 
|-id=733 bgcolor=#E9E9E9
| 188733 ||  || — || October 22, 2005 || Palomar || NEAT || — || align=right | 3.5 km || 
|-id=734 bgcolor=#E9E9E9
| 188734 ||  || — || October 23, 2005 || Palomar || NEAT || — || align=right | 2.2 km || 
|-id=735 bgcolor=#d6d6d6
| 188735 ||  || — || October 25, 2005 || Catalina || CSS || — || align=right | 5.2 km || 
|-id=736 bgcolor=#d6d6d6
| 188736 ||  || — || October 22, 2005 || Kitt Peak || Spacewatch || — || align=right | 2.7 km || 
|-id=737 bgcolor=#d6d6d6
| 188737 ||  || — || October 23, 2005 || Palomar || NEAT || — || align=right | 3.4 km || 
|-id=738 bgcolor=#d6d6d6
| 188738 ||  || — || October 24, 2005 || Kitt Peak || Spacewatch || — || align=right | 3.5 km || 
|-id=739 bgcolor=#E9E9E9
| 188739 ||  || — || October 24, 2005 || Kitt Peak || Spacewatch || — || align=right | 2.9 km || 
|-id=740 bgcolor=#d6d6d6
| 188740 ||  || — || October 25, 2005 || Kitt Peak || Spacewatch || — || align=right | 3.0 km || 
|-id=741 bgcolor=#E9E9E9
| 188741 ||  || — || October 25, 2005 || Catalina || CSS || — || align=right | 2.3 km || 
|-id=742 bgcolor=#fefefe
| 188742 ||  || — || October 25, 2005 || Catalina || CSS || V || align=right data-sort-value="0.91" | 910 m || 
|-id=743 bgcolor=#d6d6d6
| 188743 ||  || — || October 25, 2005 || Mount Lemmon || Mount Lemmon Survey || — || align=right | 3.2 km || 
|-id=744 bgcolor=#d6d6d6
| 188744 ||  || — || October 26, 2005 || Kitt Peak || Spacewatch || BRA || align=right | 2.0 km || 
|-id=745 bgcolor=#E9E9E9
| 188745 ||  || — || October 26, 2005 || Kitt Peak || Spacewatch || — || align=right | 1.6 km || 
|-id=746 bgcolor=#E9E9E9
| 188746 ||  || — || October 27, 2005 || Anderson Mesa || LONEOS || — || align=right | 3.1 km || 
|-id=747 bgcolor=#E9E9E9
| 188747 ||  || — || October 24, 2005 || Kitt Peak || Spacewatch || — || align=right | 2.0 km || 
|-id=748 bgcolor=#E9E9E9
| 188748 ||  || — || October 24, 2005 || Kitt Peak || Spacewatch || — || align=right | 2.9 km || 
|-id=749 bgcolor=#d6d6d6
| 188749 ||  || — || October 25, 2005 || Kitt Peak || Spacewatch || — || align=right | 4.3 km || 
|-id=750 bgcolor=#d6d6d6
| 188750 ||  || — || October 25, 2005 || Kitt Peak || Spacewatch || KOR || align=right | 1.7 km || 
|-id=751 bgcolor=#E9E9E9
| 188751 ||  || — || October 25, 2005 || Mount Lemmon || Mount Lemmon Survey || — || align=right | 2.0 km || 
|-id=752 bgcolor=#d6d6d6
| 188752 ||  || — || October 25, 2005 || Mount Lemmon || Mount Lemmon Survey || — || align=right | 3.4 km || 
|-id=753 bgcolor=#E9E9E9
| 188753 ||  || — || October 25, 2005 || Kitt Peak || Spacewatch || — || align=right | 3.1 km || 
|-id=754 bgcolor=#d6d6d6
| 188754 ||  || — || October 24, 2005 || Kitt Peak || Spacewatch || K-2 || align=right | 1.9 km || 
|-id=755 bgcolor=#d6d6d6
| 188755 ||  || — || October 25, 2005 || Kitt Peak || Spacewatch || K-2 || align=right | 2.2 km || 
|-id=756 bgcolor=#d6d6d6
| 188756 ||  || — || October 27, 2005 || Kitt Peak || Spacewatch || — || align=right | 3.3 km || 
|-id=757 bgcolor=#E9E9E9
| 188757 ||  || — || October 26, 2005 || Kitt Peak || Spacewatch || — || align=right | 1.9 km || 
|-id=758 bgcolor=#d6d6d6
| 188758 ||  || — || October 26, 2005 || Kitt Peak || Spacewatch || THM || align=right | 2.9 km || 
|-id=759 bgcolor=#E9E9E9
| 188759 ||  || — || October 26, 2005 || Kitt Peak || Spacewatch || — || align=right | 3.3 km || 
|-id=760 bgcolor=#d6d6d6
| 188760 ||  || — || October 26, 2005 || Kitt Peak || Spacewatch || — || align=right | 4.8 km || 
|-id=761 bgcolor=#E9E9E9
| 188761 ||  || — || October 29, 2005 || Kitt Peak || Spacewatch || — || align=right | 1.1 km || 
|-id=762 bgcolor=#d6d6d6
| 188762 ||  || — || October 29, 2005 || Mount Lemmon || Mount Lemmon Survey || — || align=right | 4.7 km || 
|-id=763 bgcolor=#E9E9E9
| 188763 ||  || — || October 27, 2005 || Kitt Peak || Spacewatch || HEN || align=right | 1.3 km || 
|-id=764 bgcolor=#E9E9E9
| 188764 ||  || — || October 30, 2005 || Catalina || CSS || — || align=right | 3.0 km || 
|-id=765 bgcolor=#E9E9E9
| 188765 ||  || — || October 30, 2005 || Kitt Peak || Spacewatch || — || align=right | 1.3 km || 
|-id=766 bgcolor=#fefefe
| 188766 ||  || — || October 28, 2005 || Mount Lemmon || Mount Lemmon Survey || — || align=right | 1.1 km || 
|-id=767 bgcolor=#E9E9E9
| 188767 ||  || — || October 30, 2005 || Mount Lemmon || Mount Lemmon Survey || — || align=right | 2.1 km || 
|-id=768 bgcolor=#E9E9E9
| 188768 ||  || — || October 28, 2005 || Mount Lemmon || Mount Lemmon Survey || AST || align=right | 1.9 km || 
|-id=769 bgcolor=#E9E9E9
| 188769 ||  || — || October 28, 2005 || Catalina || CSS || AGN || align=right | 1.7 km || 
|-id=770 bgcolor=#d6d6d6
| 188770 ||  || — || October 30, 2005 || Kitt Peak || Spacewatch || KOR || align=right | 1.6 km || 
|-id=771 bgcolor=#d6d6d6
| 188771 ||  || — || October 31, 2005 || Mount Lemmon || Mount Lemmon Survey || ARM || align=right | 5.4 km || 
|-id=772 bgcolor=#fefefe
| 188772 ||  || — || October 28, 2005 || Kitt Peak || Spacewatch || V || align=right data-sort-value="0.86" | 860 m || 
|-id=773 bgcolor=#fefefe
| 188773 ||  || — || October 30, 2005 || Kitt Peak || Spacewatch || V || align=right | 1.1 km || 
|-id=774 bgcolor=#E9E9E9
| 188774 ||  || — || October 27, 2005 || Mount Lemmon || Mount Lemmon Survey || — || align=right | 1.3 km || 
|-id=775 bgcolor=#E9E9E9
| 188775 ||  || — || October 27, 2005 || Palomar || NEAT || — || align=right | 2.0 km || 
|-id=776 bgcolor=#E9E9E9
| 188776 ||  || — || October 27, 2005 || Anderson Mesa || LONEOS || NEM || align=right | 2.9 km || 
|-id=777 bgcolor=#E9E9E9
| 188777 ||  || — || October 31, 2005 || Anderson Mesa || LONEOS || WIT || align=right | 1.3 km || 
|-id=778 bgcolor=#E9E9E9
| 188778 ||  || — || October 26, 2005 || Kitt Peak || Spacewatch || — || align=right | 2.7 km || 
|-id=779 bgcolor=#d6d6d6
| 188779 ||  || — || October 25, 2005 || Kitt Peak || Spacewatch || — || align=right | 3.4 km || 
|-id=780 bgcolor=#d6d6d6
| 188780 ||  || — || October 29, 2005 || Mount Lemmon || Mount Lemmon Survey || 628 || align=right | 2.6 km || 
|-id=781 bgcolor=#fefefe
| 188781 ||  || — || October 25, 2005 || Apache Point || A. C. Becker || — || align=right data-sort-value="0.75" | 750 m || 
|-id=782 bgcolor=#d6d6d6
| 188782 ||  || — || November 1, 2005 || Kitt Peak || Spacewatch || K-2 || align=right | 1.4 km || 
|-id=783 bgcolor=#d6d6d6
| 188783 ||  || — || November 3, 2005 || Kitt Peak || Spacewatch || — || align=right | 3.2 km || 
|-id=784 bgcolor=#d6d6d6
| 188784 ||  || — || November 2, 2005 || Mount Lemmon || Mount Lemmon Survey || — || align=right | 3.4 km || 
|-id=785 bgcolor=#E9E9E9
| 188785 ||  || — || November 4, 2005 || Mount Lemmon || Mount Lemmon Survey || — || align=right | 1.3 km || 
|-id=786 bgcolor=#d6d6d6
| 188786 ||  || — || November 3, 2005 || Mount Lemmon || Mount Lemmon Survey || EOS || align=right | 3.6 km || 
|-id=787 bgcolor=#E9E9E9
| 188787 ||  || — || November 5, 2005 || Mount Lemmon || Mount Lemmon Survey || — || align=right | 2.0 km || 
|-id=788 bgcolor=#E9E9E9
| 188788 ||  || — || November 3, 2005 || Socorro || LINEAR || EUN || align=right | 2.1 km || 
|-id=789 bgcolor=#d6d6d6
| 188789 ||  || — || November 3, 2005 || Catalina || CSS || — || align=right | 6.7 km || 
|-id=790 bgcolor=#d6d6d6
| 188790 ||  || — || November 5, 2005 || Kitt Peak || Spacewatch || — || align=right | 3.2 km || 
|-id=791 bgcolor=#E9E9E9
| 188791 ||  || — || November 1, 2005 || Mount Lemmon || Mount Lemmon Survey || — || align=right | 2.0 km || 
|-id=792 bgcolor=#E9E9E9
| 188792 ||  || — || November 5, 2005 || Kitt Peak || Spacewatch || — || align=right | 3.3 km || 
|-id=793 bgcolor=#d6d6d6
| 188793 ||  || — || November 7, 2005 || Socorro || LINEAR || EOS || align=right | 3.0 km || 
|-id=794 bgcolor=#E9E9E9
| 188794 ||  || — || November 6, 2005 || Mount Lemmon || Mount Lemmon Survey || NEM || align=right | 2.8 km || 
|-id=795 bgcolor=#d6d6d6
| 188795 ||  || — || November 10, 2005 || Mount Lemmon || Mount Lemmon Survey || 7:4 || align=right | 4.1 km || 
|-id=796 bgcolor=#d6d6d6
| 188796 ||  || — || November 11, 2005 || Kitt Peak || Spacewatch || — || align=right | 3.4 km || 
|-id=797 bgcolor=#d6d6d6
| 188797 ||  || — || November 5, 2005 || Socorro || LINEAR || — || align=right | 6.3 km || 
|-id=798 bgcolor=#d6d6d6
| 188798 ||  || — || November 21, 2005 || Kitt Peak || Spacewatch || VER || align=right | 4.1 km || 
|-id=799 bgcolor=#E9E9E9
| 188799 ||  || — || November 21, 2005 || Catalina || CSS || — || align=right | 2.6 km || 
|-id=800 bgcolor=#d6d6d6
| 188800 ||  || — || November 25, 2005 || Catalina || CSS || — || align=right | 4.5 km || 
|}

188801–188900 

|-bgcolor=#d6d6d6
| 188801 ||  || — || November 22, 2005 || Kitt Peak || Spacewatch || KOR || align=right | 1.9 km || 
|-id=802 bgcolor=#d6d6d6
| 188802 ||  || — || November 22, 2005 || Kitt Peak || Spacewatch || — || align=right | 5.0 km || 
|-id=803 bgcolor=#fefefe
| 188803 ||  || — || November 25, 2005 || Kitt Peak || Spacewatch || — || align=right | 1.3 km || 
|-id=804 bgcolor=#d6d6d6
| 188804 ||  || — || November 28, 2005 || Socorro || LINEAR || — || align=right | 5.8 km || 
|-id=805 bgcolor=#E9E9E9
| 188805 ||  || — || November 23, 2005 || Socorro || LINEAR || — || align=right | 2.3 km || 
|-id=806 bgcolor=#E9E9E9
| 188806 ||  || — || November 26, 2005 || Catalina || CSS || — || align=right | 1.5 km || 
|-id=807 bgcolor=#E9E9E9
| 188807 ||  || — || November 30, 2005 || Socorro || LINEAR || MIS || align=right | 3.5 km || 
|-id=808 bgcolor=#d6d6d6
| 188808 ||  || — || November 30, 2005 || Mount Lemmon || Mount Lemmon Survey || KOR || align=right | 1.8 km || 
|-id=809 bgcolor=#E9E9E9
| 188809 ||  || — || November 25, 2005 || Catalina || CSS || — || align=right | 2.2 km || 
|-id=810 bgcolor=#E9E9E9
| 188810 ||  || — || November 26, 2005 || Socorro || LINEAR || — || align=right | 2.8 km || 
|-id=811 bgcolor=#d6d6d6
| 188811 ||  || — || November 29, 2005 || Palomar || NEAT || — || align=right | 5.2 km || 
|-id=812 bgcolor=#d6d6d6
| 188812 ||  || — || November 20, 2005 || Palomar || NEAT || — || align=right | 4.7 km || 
|-id=813 bgcolor=#d6d6d6
| 188813 ||  || — || December 1, 2005 || Kitt Peak || Spacewatch || — || align=right | 2.9 km || 
|-id=814 bgcolor=#E9E9E9
| 188814 ||  || — || December 1, 2005 || Kitt Peak || Spacewatch || GEF || align=right | 2.0 km || 
|-id=815 bgcolor=#E9E9E9
| 188815 ||  || — || December 1, 2005 || Kitt Peak || Spacewatch || HEN || align=right | 1.6 km || 
|-id=816 bgcolor=#d6d6d6
| 188816 ||  || — || December 2, 2005 || Mount Lemmon || Mount Lemmon Survey || — || align=right | 4.8 km || 
|-id=817 bgcolor=#d6d6d6
| 188817 ||  || — || December 4, 2005 || Kitt Peak || Spacewatch || EOS || align=right | 3.2 km || 
|-id=818 bgcolor=#d6d6d6
| 188818 ||  || — || December 6, 2005 || Kitt Peak || Spacewatch || — || align=right | 4.6 km || 
|-id=819 bgcolor=#d6d6d6
| 188819 ||  || — || December 6, 2005 || Socorro || LINEAR || — || align=right | 4.0 km || 
|-id=820 bgcolor=#E9E9E9
| 188820 ||  || — || December 22, 2005 || RAS || A. Lowe || — || align=right | 3.1 km || 
|-id=821 bgcolor=#E9E9E9
| 188821 ||  || — || December 21, 2005 || Kitt Peak || Spacewatch || — || align=right | 1.8 km || 
|-id=822 bgcolor=#d6d6d6
| 188822 ||  || — || December 25, 2005 || Mount Lemmon || Mount Lemmon Survey || — || align=right | 3.6 km || 
|-id=823 bgcolor=#d6d6d6
| 188823 ||  || — || December 26, 2005 || Mount Lemmon || Mount Lemmon Survey || EOS || align=right | 3.0 km || 
|-id=824 bgcolor=#d6d6d6
| 188824 ||  || — || December 24, 2005 || Kitt Peak || Spacewatch || — || align=right | 4.4 km || 
|-id=825 bgcolor=#d6d6d6
| 188825 ||  || — || December 23, 2005 || Kitt Peak || Spacewatch || — || align=right | 3.1 km || 
|-id=826 bgcolor=#d6d6d6
| 188826 ||  || — || December 31, 2005 || Kitt Peak || Spacewatch || EOS || align=right | 3.1 km || 
|-id=827 bgcolor=#d6d6d6
| 188827 ||  || — || December 23, 2005 || Kitt Peak || Spacewatch || — || align=right | 4.2 km || 
|-id=828 bgcolor=#E9E9E9
| 188828 ||  || — || December 25, 2005 || Kitt Peak || Spacewatch || — || align=right | 2.4 km || 
|-id=829 bgcolor=#d6d6d6
| 188829 ||  || — || January 5, 2006 || Catalina || CSS || — || align=right | 3.1 km || 
|-id=830 bgcolor=#d6d6d6
| 188830 ||  || — || January 5, 2006 || Catalina || CSS || HIL3:2 || align=right | 8.4 km || 
|-id=831 bgcolor=#d6d6d6
| 188831 ||  || — || January 5, 2006 || Socorro || LINEAR || 3:2 || align=right | 5.5 km || 
|-id=832 bgcolor=#d6d6d6
| 188832 ||  || — || January 8, 2006 || Kitt Peak || Spacewatch || THM || align=right | 3.4 km || 
|-id=833 bgcolor=#d6d6d6
| 188833 ||  || — || January 23, 2006 || Mount Lemmon || Mount Lemmon Survey || KOR || align=right | 2.3 km || 
|-id=834 bgcolor=#d6d6d6
| 188834 ||  || — || January 23, 2006 || Socorro || LINEAR || — || align=right | 5.7 km || 
|-id=835 bgcolor=#C2FFFF
| 188835 ||  || — || January 25, 2006 || Kitt Peak || Spacewatch || L5 || align=right | 8.3 km || 
|-id=836 bgcolor=#C2FFFF
| 188836 ||  || — || January 26, 2006 || Kitt Peak || Spacewatch || L5 || align=right | 10 km || 
|-id=837 bgcolor=#C2FFFF
| 188837 ||  || — || January 30, 2006 || Kitt Peak || Spacewatch || L5 || align=right | 13 km || 
|-id=838 bgcolor=#d6d6d6
| 188838 ||  || — || January 31, 2006 || Mount Lemmon || Mount Lemmon Survey || — || align=right | 5.7 km || 
|-id=839 bgcolor=#d6d6d6
| 188839 ||  || — || February 1, 2006 || Mount Lemmon || Mount Lemmon Survey || EOS || align=right | 2.5 km || 
|-id=840 bgcolor=#d6d6d6
| 188840 ||  || — || February 1, 2006 || Mount Lemmon || Mount Lemmon Survey || — || align=right | 3.7 km || 
|-id=841 bgcolor=#C2FFFF
| 188841 ||  || — || February 22, 2006 || Kitt Peak || Spacewatch || L5 || align=right | 11 km || 
|-id=842 bgcolor=#C2FFFF
| 188842 ||  || — || February 25, 2006 || Kitt Peak || Spacewatch || L5 || align=right | 9.2 km || 
|-id=843 bgcolor=#C2FFFF
| 188843 ||  || — || February 25, 2006 || Kitt Peak || Spacewatch || L5 || align=right | 9.8 km || 
|-id=844 bgcolor=#C2FFFF
| 188844 ||  || — || February 27, 2006 || Kitt Peak || Spacewatch || L5 || align=right | 8.8 km || 
|-id=845 bgcolor=#C2FFFF
| 188845 ||  || — || February 27, 2006 || Kitt Peak || Spacewatch || L5 || align=right | 11 km || 
|-id=846 bgcolor=#C2FFFF
| 188846 ||  || — || March 3, 2006 || Kitt Peak || Spacewatch || L5 || align=right | 12 km || 
|-id=847 bgcolor=#C2FFFF
| 188847 Rhipeus ||  ||  || March 23, 2006 || Calvin-Rehoboth || Calvin–Rehoboth Obs. || L5 || align=right | 9.4 km || 
|-id=848 bgcolor=#fefefe
| 188848 ||  || — || September 15, 2006 || Kitt Peak || Spacewatch || — || align=right data-sort-value="0.78" | 780 m || 
|-id=849 bgcolor=#fefefe
| 188849 ||  || — || September 18, 2006 || Socorro || LINEAR || H || align=right | 1.3 km || 
|-id=850 bgcolor=#fefefe
| 188850 ||  || — || September 18, 2006 || Kitt Peak || Spacewatch || NYS || align=right data-sort-value="0.78" | 780 m || 
|-id=851 bgcolor=#fefefe
| 188851 ||  || — || September 18, 2006 || Kitt Peak || Spacewatch || MAS || align=right data-sort-value="0.72" | 720 m || 
|-id=852 bgcolor=#fefefe
| 188852 ||  || — || September 24, 2006 || Kitt Peak || Spacewatch || — || align=right data-sort-value="0.80" | 800 m || 
|-id=853 bgcolor=#fefefe
| 188853 ||  || — || September 19, 2006 || Kitt Peak || Spacewatch || — || align=right data-sort-value="0.88" | 880 m || 
|-id=854 bgcolor=#fefefe
| 188854 ||  || — || September 19, 2006 || Kitt Peak || Spacewatch || NYS || align=right data-sort-value="0.79" | 790 m || 
|-id=855 bgcolor=#fefefe
| 188855 ||  || — || September 28, 2006 || RAS || A. Lowe || — || align=right | 1.2 km || 
|-id=856 bgcolor=#fefefe
| 188856 ||  || — || September 26, 2006 || Catalina || CSS || — || align=right | 1.1 km || 
|-id=857 bgcolor=#fefefe
| 188857 ||  || — || September 28, 2006 || Kitt Peak || Spacewatch || — || align=right | 1.1 km || 
|-id=858 bgcolor=#fefefe
| 188858 ||  || — || October 11, 2006 || Kitt Peak || Spacewatch || — || align=right | 1.0 km || 
|-id=859 bgcolor=#fefefe
| 188859 ||  || — || October 11, 2006 || Kitt Peak || Spacewatch || FLO || align=right data-sort-value="0.81" | 810 m || 
|-id=860 bgcolor=#fefefe
| 188860 ||  || — || October 12, 2006 || Kitt Peak || Spacewatch || — || align=right data-sort-value="0.87" | 870 m || 
|-id=861 bgcolor=#d6d6d6
| 188861 ||  || — || October 12, 2006 || Kitt Peak || Spacewatch || TEL || align=right | 2.4 km || 
|-id=862 bgcolor=#fefefe
| 188862 ||  || — || October 12, 2006 || Kitt Peak || Spacewatch || — || align=right data-sort-value="0.99" | 990 m || 
|-id=863 bgcolor=#fefefe
| 188863 ||  || — || October 15, 2006 || Kitt Peak || Spacewatch || — || align=right data-sort-value="0.99" | 990 m || 
|-id=864 bgcolor=#fefefe
| 188864 ||  || — || October 19, 2006 || Kitt Peak || Spacewatch || NYS || align=right data-sort-value="0.81" | 810 m || 
|-id=865 bgcolor=#fefefe
| 188865 ||  || — || October 19, 2006 || Kitt Peak || Spacewatch || — || align=right data-sort-value="0.81" | 810 m || 
|-id=866 bgcolor=#E9E9E9
| 188866 ||  || — || October 20, 2006 || Catalina || CSS || — || align=right | 2.3 km || 
|-id=867 bgcolor=#fefefe
| 188867 Tin Ho ||  ||  || October 21, 2006 || Lulin Observatory || Q.-z. Ye, H.-C. Lin || ERI || align=right | 1.6 km || 
|-id=868 bgcolor=#E9E9E9
| 188868 ||  || — || October 16, 2006 || Catalina || CSS || — || align=right | 1.6 km || 
|-id=869 bgcolor=#E9E9E9
| 188869 ||  || — || October 20, 2006 || Kitt Peak || Spacewatch || MIS || align=right | 4.0 km || 
|-id=870 bgcolor=#E9E9E9
| 188870 ||  || — || October 21, 2006 || Mount Lemmon || Mount Lemmon Survey || — || align=right | 2.1 km || 
|-id=871 bgcolor=#E9E9E9
| 188871 ||  || — || October 27, 2006 || Mount Lemmon || Mount Lemmon Survey || — || align=right | 2.2 km || 
|-id=872 bgcolor=#fefefe
| 188872 ||  || — || October 27, 2006 || Mount Lemmon || Mount Lemmon Survey || H || align=right | 1.00 km || 
|-id=873 bgcolor=#fefefe
| 188873 ||  || — || October 27, 2006 || Mount Lemmon || Mount Lemmon Survey || — || align=right | 1.2 km || 
|-id=874 bgcolor=#fefefe
| 188874 ||  || — || October 28, 2006 || Kitt Peak || Spacewatch || NYS || align=right data-sort-value="0.81" | 810 m || 
|-id=875 bgcolor=#fefefe
| 188875 ||  || — || November 10, 2006 || Kitt Peak || Spacewatch || — || align=right | 1.2 km || 
|-id=876 bgcolor=#fefefe
| 188876 ||  || — || November 9, 2006 || Kitt Peak || Spacewatch || — || align=right data-sort-value="0.98" | 980 m || 
|-id=877 bgcolor=#d6d6d6
| 188877 ||  || — || November 13, 2006 || Mount Lemmon || Mount Lemmon Survey || TIR || align=right | 5.0 km || 
|-id=878 bgcolor=#fefefe
| 188878 ||  || — || November 11, 2006 || Kitt Peak || Spacewatch || — || align=right data-sort-value="0.94" | 940 m || 
|-id=879 bgcolor=#fefefe
| 188879 ||  || — || November 11, 2006 || Kitt Peak || Spacewatch || NYS || align=right data-sort-value="0.86" | 860 m || 
|-id=880 bgcolor=#fefefe
| 188880 ||  || — || November 13, 2006 || Kitt Peak || Spacewatch || — || align=right | 1.3 km || 
|-id=881 bgcolor=#fefefe
| 188881 ||  || — || November 16, 2006 || Mount Lemmon || Mount Lemmon Survey || — || align=right | 1.3 km || 
|-id=882 bgcolor=#fefefe
| 188882 ||  || — || November 16, 2006 || Mount Lemmon || Mount Lemmon Survey || — || align=right | 1.1 km || 
|-id=883 bgcolor=#fefefe
| 188883 ||  || — || November 16, 2006 || Kitt Peak || Spacewatch || — || align=right | 1.1 km || 
|-id=884 bgcolor=#E9E9E9
| 188884 ||  || — || November 16, 2006 || Kitt Peak || Spacewatch || — || align=right | 2.1 km || 
|-id=885 bgcolor=#fefefe
| 188885 ||  || — || November 17, 2006 || Mount Lemmon || Mount Lemmon Survey || V || align=right data-sort-value="0.92" | 920 m || 
|-id=886 bgcolor=#E9E9E9
| 188886 ||  || — || November 18, 2006 || Kitt Peak || Spacewatch || — || align=right | 1.9 km || 
|-id=887 bgcolor=#fefefe
| 188887 ||  || — || November 21, 2006 || Socorro || LINEAR || — || align=right | 1.3 km || 
|-id=888 bgcolor=#E9E9E9
| 188888 ||  || — || November 23, 2006 || Kitt Peak || Spacewatch || — || align=right | 1.8 km || 
|-id=889 bgcolor=#E9E9E9
| 188889 ||  || — || November 20, 2006 || Catalina || CSS || — || align=right | 3.7 km || 
|-id=890 bgcolor=#fefefe
| 188890 || 2006 XQ || — || December 9, 2006 || Pla D'Arguines || R. Ferrando || NYS || align=right data-sort-value="0.90" | 900 m || 
|-id=891 bgcolor=#E9E9E9
| 188891 ||  || — || December 9, 2006 || Kitt Peak || Spacewatch || — || align=right | 1.4 km || 
|-id=892 bgcolor=#fefefe
| 188892 ||  || — || December 11, 2006 || Kitt Peak || Spacewatch || NYS || align=right | 1.1 km || 
|-id=893 bgcolor=#E9E9E9
| 188893 ||  || — || December 12, 2006 || Catalina || CSS || — || align=right | 1.5 km || 
|-id=894 bgcolor=#fefefe
| 188894 Gerberlouis ||  ||  || December 15, 2006 || Marly || P. Kocher || — || align=right | 1.3 km || 
|-id=895 bgcolor=#fefefe
| 188895 ||  || — || December 15, 2006 || Kitt Peak || Spacewatch || — || align=right | 1.2 km || 
|-id=896 bgcolor=#E9E9E9
| 188896 ||  || — || December 1, 2006 || Catalina || CSS || — || align=right | 2.0 km || 
|-id=897 bgcolor=#E9E9E9
| 188897 ||  || — || December 20, 2006 || Mount Lemmon || Mount Lemmon Survey || — || align=right | 1.3 km || 
|-id=898 bgcolor=#fefefe
| 188898 ||  || — || December 22, 2006 || Kitt Peak || Spacewatch || FLO || align=right | 1.2 km || 
|-id=899 bgcolor=#E9E9E9
| 188899 ||  || — || December 21, 2006 || Palomar || NEAT || — || align=right | 1.5 km || 
|-id=900 bgcolor=#fefefe
| 188900 ||  || — || January 10, 2007 || Nyukasa || Mount Nyukasa Stn. || — || align=right | 1.4 km || 
|}

188901–189000 

|-bgcolor=#d6d6d6
| 188901 ||  || — || January 10, 2007 || Nyukasa || Mount Nyukasa Stn. || KOR || align=right | 1.7 km || 
|-id=902 bgcolor=#E9E9E9
| 188902 ||  || — || January 9, 2007 || Mount Lemmon || Mount Lemmon Survey || — || align=right | 1.3 km || 
|-id=903 bgcolor=#E9E9E9
| 188903 ||  || — || January 15, 2007 || Anderson Mesa || LONEOS || — || align=right | 3.3 km || 
|-id=904 bgcolor=#E9E9E9
| 188904 ||  || — || January 10, 2007 || Mount Lemmon || Mount Lemmon Survey || — || align=right | 3.1 km || 
|-id=905 bgcolor=#fefefe
| 188905 ||  || — || January 15, 2007 || Anderson Mesa || LONEOS || — || align=right | 1.3 km || 
|-id=906 bgcolor=#E9E9E9
| 188906 ||  || — || January 9, 2007 || Mount Lemmon || Mount Lemmon Survey || HOF || align=right | 3.5 km || 
|-id=907 bgcolor=#E9E9E9
| 188907 ||  || — || January 17, 2007 || Kitt Peak || Spacewatch || GEF || align=right | 1.9 km || 
|-id=908 bgcolor=#E9E9E9
| 188908 ||  || — || January 16, 2007 || Anderson Mesa || LONEOS || ADE || align=right | 2.5 km || 
|-id=909 bgcolor=#E9E9E9
| 188909 ||  || — || January 17, 2007 || Catalina || CSS || — || align=right | 3.1 km || 
|-id=910 bgcolor=#E9E9E9
| 188910 ||  || — || January 17, 2007 || Kitt Peak || Spacewatch || — || align=right | 1.3 km || 
|-id=911 bgcolor=#E9E9E9
| 188911 ||  || — || January 17, 2007 || Palomar || NEAT || WIT || align=right | 1.5 km || 
|-id=912 bgcolor=#E9E9E9
| 188912 ||  || — || January 17, 2007 || Kitt Peak || Spacewatch || NEM || align=right | 3.1 km || 
|-id=913 bgcolor=#d6d6d6
| 188913 ||  || — || January 17, 2007 || Kitt Peak || Spacewatch || KAR || align=right | 1.1 km || 
|-id=914 bgcolor=#d6d6d6
| 188914 ||  || — || January 17, 2007 || Palomar || NEAT || — || align=right | 6.2 km || 
|-id=915 bgcolor=#E9E9E9
| 188915 ||  || — || January 21, 2007 || Socorro || LINEAR || — || align=right | 1.7 km || 
|-id=916 bgcolor=#E9E9E9
| 188916 ||  || — || January 24, 2007 || Catalina || CSS || — || align=right | 3.4 km || 
|-id=917 bgcolor=#d6d6d6
| 188917 ||  || — || January 26, 2007 || Kitt Peak || Spacewatch || — || align=right | 4.4 km || 
|-id=918 bgcolor=#E9E9E9
| 188918 ||  || — || January 21, 2007 || Socorro || LINEAR || — || align=right | 3.2 km || 
|-id=919 bgcolor=#E9E9E9
| 188919 ||  || — || January 24, 2007 || Kitt Peak || Spacewatch || — || align=right | 2.7 km || 
|-id=920 bgcolor=#E9E9E9
| 188920 ||  || — || January 27, 2007 || Kitt Peak || Spacewatch || — || align=right | 2.9 km || 
|-id=921 bgcolor=#d6d6d6
| 188921 ||  || — || January 27, 2007 || Mount Lemmon || Mount Lemmon Survey || KOR || align=right | 2.1 km || 
|-id=922 bgcolor=#d6d6d6
| 188922 ||  || — || January 27, 2007 || Mount Lemmon || Mount Lemmon Survey || — || align=right | 3.4 km || 
|-id=923 bgcolor=#d6d6d6
| 188923 ||  || — || January 16, 2007 || Anderson Mesa || LONEOS || — || align=right | 5.7 km || 
|-id=924 bgcolor=#d6d6d6
| 188924 ||  || — || January 29, 2007 || Kitt Peak || Spacewatch || — || align=right | 3.0 km || 
|-id=925 bgcolor=#d6d6d6
| 188925 ||  || — || January 16, 2007 || Catalina || CSS || — || align=right | 4.9 km || 
|-id=926 bgcolor=#fefefe
| 188926 ||  || — || February 6, 2007 || Kitt Peak || Spacewatch || NYS || align=right data-sort-value="0.96" | 960 m || 
|-id=927 bgcolor=#d6d6d6
| 188927 ||  || — || February 6, 2007 || Kitt Peak || Spacewatch || 7:4 || align=right | 4.6 km || 
|-id=928 bgcolor=#d6d6d6
| 188928 ||  || — || February 6, 2007 || Kitt Peak || Spacewatch || — || align=right | 2.9 km || 
|-id=929 bgcolor=#d6d6d6
| 188929 ||  || — || February 6, 2007 || Kitt Peak || Spacewatch || KOR || align=right | 1.5 km || 
|-id=930 bgcolor=#E9E9E9
| 188930 ||  || — || February 6, 2007 || Palomar || NEAT || — || align=right | 2.9 km || 
|-id=931 bgcolor=#E9E9E9
| 188931 ||  || — || February 8, 2007 || Catalina || CSS || — || align=right | 2.1 km || 
|-id=932 bgcolor=#E9E9E9
| 188932 ||  || — || February 6, 2007 || Mount Lemmon || Mount Lemmon Survey || — || align=right | 1.8 km || 
|-id=933 bgcolor=#E9E9E9
| 188933 ||  || — || February 6, 2007 || Mount Lemmon || Mount Lemmon Survey || — || align=right | 2.5 km || 
|-id=934 bgcolor=#fefefe
| 188934 ||  || — || February 7, 2007 || Palomar || NEAT || V || align=right data-sort-value="0.96" | 960 m || 
|-id=935 bgcolor=#E9E9E9
| 188935 ||  || — || February 7, 2007 || Mount Lemmon || Mount Lemmon Survey || AGN || align=right | 1.7 km || 
|-id=936 bgcolor=#E9E9E9
| 188936 ||  || — || February 9, 2007 || Catalina || CSS || — || align=right | 3.0 km || 
|-id=937 bgcolor=#d6d6d6
| 188937 ||  || — || February 9, 2007 || Catalina || CSS || — || align=right | 4.3 km || 
|-id=938 bgcolor=#d6d6d6
| 188938 ||  || — || February 18, 2007 || Eskridge || Farpoint Obs. || EOS || align=right | 2.7 km || 
|-id=939 bgcolor=#d6d6d6
| 188939 ||  || — || February 16, 2007 || Catalina || CSS || — || align=right | 4.2 km || 
|-id=940 bgcolor=#d6d6d6
| 188940 ||  || — || February 16, 2007 || Catalina || CSS || — || align=right | 3.7 km || 
|-id=941 bgcolor=#E9E9E9
| 188941 ||  || — || February 17, 2007 || Calvin-Rehoboth || Calvin–Rehoboth Obs. || HOF || align=right | 3.3 km || 
|-id=942 bgcolor=#C2FFFF
| 188942 ||  || — || February 21, 2007 || Eskridge || Farpoint Obs. || L5 || align=right | 14 km || 
|-id=943 bgcolor=#d6d6d6
| 188943 ||  || — || February 17, 2007 || Catalina || CSS || URS || align=right | 5.6 km || 
|-id=944 bgcolor=#d6d6d6
| 188944 ||  || — || February 21, 2007 || Socorro || LINEAR || VER || align=right | 5.3 km || 
|-id=945 bgcolor=#d6d6d6
| 188945 ||  || — || February 17, 2007 || Catalina || CSS || — || align=right | 4.9 km || 
|-id=946 bgcolor=#d6d6d6
| 188946 ||  || — || February 21, 2007 || Mount Lemmon || Mount Lemmon Survey || — || align=right | 5.0 km || 
|-id=947 bgcolor=#d6d6d6
| 188947 ||  || — || February 23, 2007 || Mount Lemmon || Mount Lemmon Survey || — || align=right | 3.7 km || 
|-id=948 bgcolor=#E9E9E9
| 188948 ||  || — || March 9, 2007 || Mount Lemmon || Mount Lemmon Survey || — || align=right | 1.3 km || 
|-id=949 bgcolor=#d6d6d6
| 188949 ||  || — || March 9, 2007 || Mount Lemmon || Mount Lemmon Survey || — || align=right | 4.4 km || 
|-id=950 bgcolor=#d6d6d6
| 188950 ||  || — || March 10, 2007 || Kitt Peak || Spacewatch || — || align=right | 4.4 km || 
|-id=951 bgcolor=#d6d6d6
| 188951 ||  || — || March 9, 2007 || Palomar || NEAT || — || align=right | 4.2 km || 
|-id=952 bgcolor=#C2FFFF
| 188952 ||  || — || March 10, 2007 || Kitt Peak || Spacewatch || L5 || align=right | 14 km || 
|-id=953 bgcolor=#E9E9E9
| 188953 ||  || — || March 11, 2007 || Kitt Peak || Spacewatch || — || align=right | 1.4 km || 
|-id=954 bgcolor=#E9E9E9
| 188954 ||  || — || March 13, 2007 || Mount Lemmon || Mount Lemmon Survey || — || align=right | 1.1 km || 
|-id=955 bgcolor=#d6d6d6
| 188955 ||  || — || March 9, 2007 || Catalina || CSS || EOS || align=right | 3.5 km || 
|-id=956 bgcolor=#d6d6d6
| 188956 ||  || — || March 9, 2007 || Mount Lemmon || Mount Lemmon Survey || — || align=right | 3.6 km || 
|-id=957 bgcolor=#E9E9E9
| 188957 ||  || — || March 14, 2007 || Mount Lemmon || Mount Lemmon Survey || — || align=right | 1.3 km || 
|-id=958 bgcolor=#fefefe
| 188958 ||  || — || March 15, 2007 || Mount Lemmon || Mount Lemmon Survey || NYS || align=right | 1.2 km || 
|-id=959 bgcolor=#d6d6d6
| 188959 ||  || — || March 8, 2007 || Palomar || NEAT || 7:4 || align=right | 6.1 km || 
|-id=960 bgcolor=#d6d6d6
| 188960 ||  || — || March 8, 2007 || Palomar || NEAT || EOS || align=right | 3.5 km || 
|-id=961 bgcolor=#d6d6d6
| 188961 ||  || — || March 8, 2007 || Palomar || NEAT || EOS || align=right | 2.8 km || 
|-id=962 bgcolor=#E9E9E9
| 188962 ||  || — || March 16, 2007 || Kitt Peak || Spacewatch || — || align=right | 3.3 km || 
|-id=963 bgcolor=#E9E9E9
| 188963 ||  || — || April 11, 2007 || Kitt Peak || Spacewatch || — || align=right | 1.8 km || 
|-id=964 bgcolor=#d6d6d6
| 188964 ||  || — || April 18, 2007 || Kitt Peak || Spacewatch || — || align=right | 3.9 km || 
|-id=965 bgcolor=#C2FFFF
| 188965 ||  || — || December 31, 2007 || Kitt Peak || Spacewatch || L5 || align=right | 16 km || 
|-id=966 bgcolor=#C2FFFF
| 188966 ||  || — || January 13, 2008 || Kitt Peak || Spacewatch || L5 || align=right | 17 km || 
|-id=967 bgcolor=#fefefe
| 188967 ||  || — || February 9, 2008 || Kitt Peak || Spacewatch || — || align=right | 1.3 km || 
|-id=968 bgcolor=#d6d6d6
| 188968 ||  || — || February 12, 2008 || Mount Lemmon || Mount Lemmon Survey || — || align=right | 4.2 km || 
|-id=969 bgcolor=#d6d6d6
| 188969 ||  || — || February 27, 2008 || Kitt Peak || Spacewatch || KOR || align=right | 2.0 km || 
|-id=970 bgcolor=#E9E9E9
| 188970 ||  || — || February 28, 2008 || Kitt Peak || Spacewatch || — || align=right | 1.4 km || 
|-id=971 bgcolor=#E9E9E9
| 188971 ||  || — || February 27, 2008 || Socorro || LINEAR || AGN || align=right | 1.9 km || 
|-id=972 bgcolor=#d6d6d6
| 188972 ||  || — || March 1, 2008 || Kitt Peak || Spacewatch || — || align=right | 4.4 km || 
|-id=973 bgcolor=#fefefe
| 188973 Siufaiwing ||  ||  || March 3, 2008 || XuYi || PMO NEO || — || align=right data-sort-value="0.79" | 790 m || 
|-id=974 bgcolor=#d6d6d6
| 188974 ||  || — || March 6, 2008 || Kitt Peak || Spacewatch || EOS || align=right | 2.1 km || 
|-id=975 bgcolor=#d6d6d6
| 188975 ||  || — || March 7, 2008 || Catalina || CSS || — || align=right | 5.1 km || 
|-id=976 bgcolor=#C2FFFF
| 188976 ||  || — || March 7, 2008 || Mount Lemmon || Mount Lemmon Survey || L5 || align=right | 18 km || 
|-id=977 bgcolor=#fefefe
| 188977 ||  || — || March 11, 2008 || Socorro || LINEAR || V || align=right | 1.0 km || 
|-id=978 bgcolor=#d6d6d6
| 188978 ||  || — || March 9, 2008 || Kitt Peak || Spacewatch || KOR || align=right | 1.8 km || 
|-id=979 bgcolor=#fefefe
| 188979 ||  || — || March 10, 2008 || Kitt Peak || Spacewatch || — || align=right data-sort-value="0.76" | 760 m || 
|-id=980 bgcolor=#d6d6d6
| 188980 ||  || — || March 26, 2008 || Kitt Peak || Spacewatch || — || align=right | 4.2 km || 
|-id=981 bgcolor=#E9E9E9
| 188981 ||  || — || March 29, 2008 || Mount Lemmon || Mount Lemmon Survey || EUN || align=right | 2.3 km || 
|-id=982 bgcolor=#fefefe
| 188982 ||  || — || March 27, 2008 || Kitt Peak || Spacewatch || V || align=right data-sort-value="0.79" | 790 m || 
|-id=983 bgcolor=#E9E9E9
| 188983 ||  || — || March 28, 2008 || Mount Lemmon || Mount Lemmon Survey || — || align=right | 3.1 km || 
|-id=984 bgcolor=#d6d6d6
| 188984 ||  || — || March 28, 2008 || Kitt Peak || Spacewatch || THM || align=right | 3.1 km || 
|-id=985 bgcolor=#E9E9E9
| 188985 ||  || — || March 27, 2008 || Mount Lemmon || Mount Lemmon Survey || — || align=right | 1.1 km || 
|-id=986 bgcolor=#C2FFFF
| 188986 ||  || — || March 28, 2008 || Kitt Peak || Spacewatch || L5 || align=right | 9.7 km || 
|-id=987 bgcolor=#fefefe
| 188987 ||  || — || March 29, 2008 || Kitt Peak || Spacewatch || KLI || align=right | 2.9 km || 
|-id=988 bgcolor=#fefefe
| 188988 ||  || — || April 3, 2008 || Kitt Peak || Spacewatch || FLO || align=right data-sort-value="0.71" | 710 m || 
|-id=989 bgcolor=#fefefe
| 188989 ||  || — || April 5, 2008 || Mount Lemmon || Mount Lemmon Survey || — || align=right | 1.0 km || 
|-id=990 bgcolor=#d6d6d6
| 188990 ||  || — || April 6, 2008 || Kitt Peak || Spacewatch || — || align=right | 3.2 km || 
|-id=991 bgcolor=#fefefe
| 188991 ||  || — || April 7, 2008 || Mount Lemmon || Mount Lemmon Survey || MAS || align=right data-sort-value="0.80" | 800 m || 
|-id=992 bgcolor=#E9E9E9
| 188992 ||  || — || April 7, 2008 || Socorro || LINEAR || — || align=right | 2.6 km || 
|-id=993 bgcolor=#E9E9E9
| 188993 ||  || — || April 11, 2008 || Catalina || CSS || GER || align=right | 2.0 km || 
|-id=994 bgcolor=#E9E9E9
| 188994 ||  || — || April 27, 2008 || OAM || OAM Obs. || — || align=right | 2.6 km || 
|-id=995 bgcolor=#d6d6d6
| 188995 ||  || — || April 26, 2008 || Kitt Peak || Spacewatch || — || align=right | 4.9 km || 
|-id=996 bgcolor=#fefefe
| 188996 ||  || — || April 29, 2008 || Kitt Peak || Spacewatch || — || align=right data-sort-value="0.83" | 830 m || 
|-id=997 bgcolor=#fefefe
| 188997 ||  || — || April 30, 2008 || Mount Lemmon || Mount Lemmon Survey || — || align=right | 1.1 km || 
|-id=998 bgcolor=#fefefe
| 188998 ||  || — || April 27, 2008 || Mount Lemmon || Mount Lemmon Survey || FLO || align=right data-sort-value="0.85" | 850 m || 
|-id=999 bgcolor=#E9E9E9
| 188999 ||  || — || April 28, 2008 || Kitt Peak || Spacewatch || — || align=right | 2.9 km || 
|-id=000 bgcolor=#fefefe
| 189000 Alfredkubin ||  ||  || May 9, 2008 || Gaisberg || R. Gierlinger || NYS || align=right data-sort-value="0.83" | 830 m || 
|}

References

External links 
 Discovery Circumstances: Numbered Minor Planets (185001)–(190000) (IAU Minor Planet Center)

0188